= List of women psychologists =

This is a list of women psychologists.

== A ==
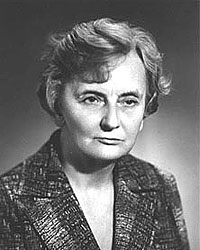
Aušra Augustinavičiūtė (1964)

Surnames beginning with A
Name	Lifetime	Field (Note: psych. is used as an abbreviation for psychology)	Comments	Refs.
Theodora Mead Abel	1899–1998			
Dorothy Adkins	1912–1975			
Alexandra Adler	1901–2001			
Mary Ainsworth	1913–1999	Developmental psych.	Known for her work in early emotional attachment with the Strange Situation design, as well as her work in the development of attachment theory.	
Estefania Aldaba-Lim	1917–2006	Clinical psych.	Recognized as the first clinical psychologist in the Philippines.	
Doris Twitchell Allen	1901–2002			
Lauren Alloy	1953–present			
Thelma Alper	1908–1988			
Elizabeth Altmaier	1952–present	Counseling psych.		
Hortensia Amaro	?–present			
Louise Bates Ames	1908–1996			
Anne Anastasi	1908–2001	Psychometrics	Introduced concept of responsibility to the test taker. 1972 president of the American Psychological Association, the third woman to be president. In 1987, she received the National Medal of Science.	
Harlene Anderson	1942–present			
Helena Antipoff	1892–1974			
Magda Arnold	1903–2002		The first contemporary theorist to develop appraisal theory of emotions, which moved the direction of emotion theory away from "feeling" theories (e.g. James-Lange theory) and "behaviorist" theories (e.g. Cannon-Bard theory) and toward the cognitive approach.	
Patricia Arredondo	1945–present	Counseling psych.	Primarily recognized for her efforts in developing the area of multicultural counseling.	
Adrienne Asch	1946–2013			
Helen Astin	1932–2015			
Lauren Y. Atlas	fl. 2000s	Neuropsychology	Studying pain and psychopharmacology	
Carolyn Attneave	1920–1992			
Aušra Augustinavičiūtė	1927–2005	Socionics	Founder of socionics, the pseudoscientific theory of information processing and personality types.	
Virginia Axline	1911–1988			

== B ==
Surnames beginning with B
Name	Lifetime	Field	Comments	Refs.
Harriet Babcock	1877–1952			
Georgia Babladelis	1931–2009			
Renée Baillargeon	1954–present	Cognitive psych.; Developmental psych.		
Emma Sophia Baker	1856–1943			
Nancy Baker	1949–present			
Josephine Ball	1898–1977			
Katharine Banham	1897–1995			
Martha Banks	1951–present			
Deirdre Barrett				
Lisa Feldman Barrett				
Franziska Baumgarten	1883–1970			
Diana Baumrind		Clinical psych.; Developmental psych.		
Nancy Bayley	1899–1994		Most notable for her contributions toward the Berkeley Growth Study in which she studied the relation between the heights of adults and children, developing a tool that helped pediatricians examine the abnormalities of their patients' heights.	
Cynthia D. Belar		Clinical psych.; Health psych.		
Deborah Belle	1948–present			
Sandra Bem	1944–2014		Known for her works in androgyny and gender studies.	
Jessica Benjamin	1946–present	Feminist psychology; Psychoanalysis		
Siham Benchekroun			Better known for her poetry	
Anna Berliner	1888–1977			
Martha E. Bernal	1931–2001			
Marion Bills	1890–1970			
Hedda Bolgar	1909–2013			
Meg Bond	?–present			
Barbara Bonner		Clinical psych.		
Lucinda Pearl Boggs	1847–1931	Child development		
Lucy May Boring	1886–1996			
Mary Brabeck	1945–present			
Virginia Braun	1972–present	critical psychology	Best known for her contributions to qualitative methodology, especially Thematic Analysis with collaborator Victoria Clarke.	
Lila Braine	1926–2015			
Grace Louise Dolmage Bredin	1903–1988			
Elsie Oschrin Bregman	1896–1969			
Marion Breiter	1952–present			
Margaret Brenman-Gibson	1914–2004			
Augusta Fox Bronner	1881–1966			
Joyce Brothers	1927–2013			
Inge Broverman	1931–1996			
Laura Brown	?–present			
Lyn Mikel Brown	1956–present			
Rose Butler Browne	1897–1986			
Alice I. Bryan	1902–1992			
Agnes Büchele	1949–present			
Jan Burns	1960–present			
Luella Buros	1901–1995	Peace psychology; Psychometrics		
Bonnie Burstow	1945–2020			
Charlotte Bühler	1893–1974			
Barbara Stoddard Burks	1902–1943			
Emily Bushnell				
E. Sandra Byers	1951–present	Clinical psychology; Sexology		
Ruth Byrne		Cognitive science		

== C ==
Surnames beginning with C
Name	Lifetime	Field	Comments	Refs.
Mary Whiton Calkins	1863–1930	Self-psych.	The first woman to become president of the American Psychological Association. She was also a philosopher. Her career focused on self-psychology and the belief that the conscious self should be the foundation of psychological study.	
Paula Caplan	1947–2021			
Susan Carey				
Cora Sutton Castle	1880–1966			
Psyche Cattell	1893–1989			Sapna Cheryan
Sapna Cheryan	1978–present	Social psychology		
Phyllis Chesler	1940–present			
E. Kitch Childs	1937–1993	Clinical psychology		
Jean Lau Chin	1944–2020			
Nancy Chodorow				
Joan Chrisler	1953–present			
Lee Anna Clark				
Mamie Phipps Clark	1917–1983	Social psych.	Most famous for her work with the gendered doll study that demonstrated latent racism in young children. She was also used as an expert witness in the Brown v. Board of Education court case.	
Victoria Clarke	present	Critical psych.	Clarke's main area of focus is qualitative research and particularly the reflexive approach to thematic analysis she has developed with Virginia Braun	
Catherine Classen	?–present			
Martha Guernsey Colby	1899–1952			
Lillian Comas-Díaz	?–present			
Helen Coons	1958–present			
Suzanne Corkin	1937–2016	Cognitive neuroscience; Neuropsych.		
Lilia Cortina	1972–present			
Leda Cosmides		Evolutionary psych.		
Catharine Cox Miles	1890–1984			
Mary Crawford	?–present			
Margaret Wooster Curti	1892–1961			
Norma E. Cutts	1892–1988			

== D ==
Surnames beginning with D
Name	Lifetime	Field	Comments	Refs.
Jessica Henderson Daniel	?–present			
Nancy Datan	1941–1987			
Katharine Bement Davis	1860–1935			
Kay Deaux	1941–present			
Tamara Dembo	1902–1993			
Florence Denmark	1932–present		Researcher of gender and women's roles.	
Helene Deutsch	1884–1982	Psychoanalysis	In 1924 she became the head of the Vienna Psychoanalytic Training Institute, making her the first woman in charge of a psychoanalysis clinic. Also recognized as the first woman psychoanalyst to be analyzed by Freud.	
Lisa Diamond	?–present			
Dorothy Dinnerstein	1923–1992			
Virginia Douglas	1927–2017			
Elizabeth Douvan	1926–2002			
June Downey	1875–1932			
Elizabeth Duffy	1904–1970			
Helen Flanders Dunbar	1902–1959			
Carol Dweck	1946–present	Social psych.		

== E ==
Surnames beginning with E
Name	Lifetime	Field	Comments	Refs.
Alice Eagly	1938–present			
Asia Anna Eaton	1980–present			
Jennifer Eberhardt	1965–present	Social psych.		
Beatrice Edgell	1871–1948			
Emma Eckstein	1865–1924	Psychoanalysis	The first woman psychoanalyst. She received psychoanalysis from Freud as a patient, and they eventually became colleagues and friends.	
Luise Eichenbaum	1952–present			
Gillian Einstein	1952–present			
Betty Eisner	1915–2004			
Ethel M. Elderton	1878–1954			
Emma L. Ellis	1968–Present	Clinical Psychology	HCPC; BABCP; Network of Christians in Psychology	
Susan Ervin-Tripp	1927–2018			
Oliva Espín	1938–present			
Jo Ann Evansgardner	1925–2010			

== F ==
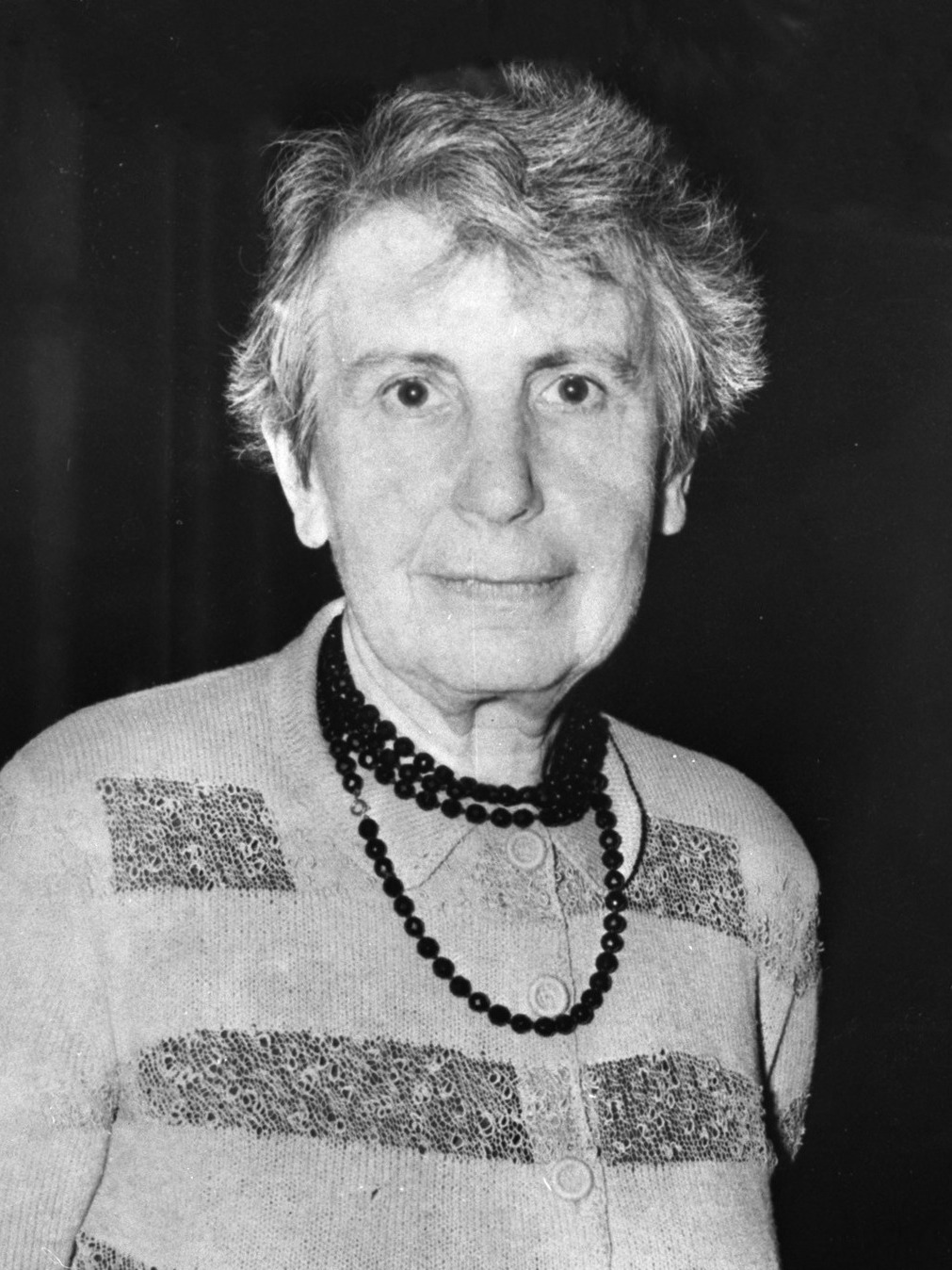
Anna Freud (1975)

Surnames beginning with F
Name	Lifetime	Field	Comments	Refs.
Grace Fernald	1879–1950			
Mabel Fernald	1883–1952			
Cordelia Fine				
Michelle Fine	?–present			
Maryanne Fisher	1975–present	Evolutionary Psychology		
Sarah Carolyn Fisher	1889–1985			
Susan Fiske		Social psych.		
Corey Elizabeth Flanders	1988–present			
Diana Fleischman	1981–present	Evolutionary psychology		
Hulda Rees Flynn	1910–2000			
Edna Foa	1937–present		Recognized as an expert in posttraumatic stress disorder. She developed prolonged exposure therapy.	
Josephine Curtis Foster	1889–1941			
Donata Francescato	1944–present	Community psych.		
Marion Rudin Frank	1942–present			
Marjorie Franklin	1887–1975	psychoanalysis		
Barbara Fredrickson		Social psych.		
Else Frenkel-Brunswik	1908–1958			
Anna Freud	1895–1982	Child psych.; Psychoanalysis	The youngest daughter of Sigmund Freud, considered to be one of the founders of psychoanalytic child psychology.	
Irene Hanson Frieze	?–present			
Erika Fromm	1909–2003			

== G ==
Surnames beginning with G
Name	Lifetime	Field	Comments	Refs.
Joanne Gallivan	1953–present			
Eleanor Acheson McCulloch Gamble	1868–1933			
Susan Gathercole				
Isabel Gauthier				
Florence Geis	1933–1993			
Mary Gergen	1938–2020			
Reva Gerstein	1917–2020			
Eleanor J. Gibson	1910–2002		Known for the study of perception in infants and toddlers and for the "visual cliff" experiment in which precocial animals, and crawling human infants, showed their ability to perceive depth by avoiding the deep side of a virtual cliff.	
Lucia Albino Gilbert	?–present	Feminist		
Lillian Gilbreth	1878–1972	Industrial/ organizational	The first industrial/organizational psychologist, who specialised in time and motion studies. Her life is depicted in the semi-autobiographical works of her children, Cheaper by the Dozen and Belles on Their Toes.	
Carol Gilligan	1936–present			
Pumla Gobodo-Madikizela	1955–present	Psychoanalysis Social psych.	Best known for her work in reconciliation, and her award-winning book, A Human Being Died That Night: A South African Story of Forgiveness	
Carla Rappaport Golden	1950–present			
Florence Goodenough	1886–1959	Developmental psych.	Known for her development of novel measurement techniques, including event sampling and the Draw-A-Man test.	
Lisa Goodman	1961–present			
Jacqueline Jarrett Goodnow	1924–2014			
Thérèse Gouin-Décarie	1923–2024			
Elizabeth Gould				
Leeat Granek	1979–present			
Beverly Greene	?–present			
Esther Greenglass	1940–present			
Germaine Guex	1904–1984			
Maria Gurevich (psychologist)	1963–present			
Marcia Guttentag	1932–1977			

== H ==
Surnames beginning with H
Name	Lifetime	Field	Comments	Refs.
Esther Halpern	1929–2008			
Eugenia Hanfmann	1905–1983			
Tsuruko Haraguchi	1886–1915	Experimental psych.	Recognized as the first Japanese woman to receive a doctorate in any field.	
Rachel Hare-Mustin	1928–2020			
Joy Harden Bradford	1979–present	Clinical psych.	She is best known as the founder of a mental health platform called Therapy for Black Girls, which includes a podcast of the same name, that specializes in mental health issues relevant to Black women.	
Margaret Kuenne Harlow	1918–1971	Developmental psychology		
Judith Rich Harris				
Molly Harrower	1906–1999	Clinical psychology		
Ruth Hartley			See Ruth Horowitz.	
Cathy Hauer	1956–present			
Florence Woolsey Hazzard	1903–1992			
Edna Heidbreder	1890–1985			
Janet E. Helms	?–present			
Ravenna Helson	1925–2020			
Mary Henle	1913–2007			
Nancy Henley	1934–2016			
Felicitas Heyne	1966–present			
Kisha B. Holden	?–present	Counseling psych.	Known for her research on mental health of African-Americans and members of other minority groups.	
Leta Hollingworth	1886–1939	Clinical psych.; Educational psych.; Psych. of women	Conducted pioneering work in the early 20th century, making significant contributions in three areas: psychology of women; clinical psychology; and educational psychology. She is best known for her work with exceptional children.	
Wendy Hollway	1949–present			
Margie Holmes				
Evelyn Gentry Hooker	1907–1996			
Olivia Hooker	1915–2018			
Matina Souretis Horner	1939–present			
Karen Horney	1885–1952	Psychoanalysis	Psychoanalyst whose theories of sexuality and of the instinct orientation of psychoanalysis questioned some traditional Freudian views. She is credited with founding feminist psychology in response to Freud's theory of penis envy.	
Ruth Horowitz	1910–1997		Also known as Ruth Hartley.	
Ruth Winifred Howard	1900–1997	Developmental psych.	Her main research focused on the development of triplets. She was one of the first women to earn a PhD in the area of psychology. She also earned a PhD in child development.	
Ethel Dench Puffer Howes	1872–1950		Noted for her work on aesthetics. She was one of the first women to receive a PhD from Harvard University.	
Ruth Hoyt-Cameron	1914–2010			
Thelma Hunt	1903–1992			

== I ==
Surnames beginning with I
Name	Lifetime	Field	Comments	Refs.
Bärbel Inhelder	1913–1997			
Susan Sutherland Isaacs	1885–1948	Educational psych.; Psychoanalysis		
Tania Israel	1966–present			
Margaret Ives	1903–2000			

== J ==
Surnames beginning with J
Name	Lifetime	Field	Comments	Refs.
Carol Nagy Jacklin	1939–2011			
Marie Jahoda	1907–2001	Social psych.		
Dorothea Jameson	1920–1998	Neuropsych.		
Kay Redfield Jamison		Clinical psych.		
Jaqueline Jesus	1978–present		Also known as an LGBT activist.	
Buford Jeannette Johnson	1880–1954			
Marcia Johnson				
Norine Johnson	1935–2011			
Virginia Johnson	1925–2013	Sexology	Pioneer in sexology, as part of the Masters and Johnson research team.	
Ingrid Johnston-Robledo	1968–present			
Mary Cover Jones	1897–1987	Behaviour therapy; Developmental psych		

== K ==
Surnames beginning with K
Name	Lifetime	Field	Comments	Refs.
Nancy Kanwisher				
Rachel Kaplan				
Ellyn Kaschak	1943–present			
Melanie Katzman	1958–present			
Nadeen Kaufman	1945–present			
Isabelle Kendig		Clinical psych.	The Head Psychologist at St. Elizabeths Hospital.	
Grace Kent	1875–1973			
Meredith Kimball	1944–present			
Doreen Kimura	1933–2013	Neuropsych.		
Celia Kitzinger	1956–present			
Barbara Klein	?–present	Clinical Psychology Attachment	Noted for her work in twin development, attachment and parenting of twins.	
Melanie Klein	1882–1960	Child psychotherapy; Psychoanalysis	Developed the "play technique" in child psychoanalysis that is widely used in contemporary play therapy, and was instrumental in the science of child psychoanalysis.	
Tomi Kōra	1896–1993			
Mary Koss	?–present			
Ruth Kronsteiner	1959–present			
Elisabeth Kübler-Ross	1926–2004			
Aylin Küntay		Language acquisition		
Neelam Kumar	1955–present			

== L ==
Surnames beginning with L
Name	Lifetime	Field	Comments	Refs.
Michelle Lafrance	1972–present			
Hope Landrine	1954–2019			
Christine Ladd-Franklin	1847–1930		Noted for her work on theories of color vision.	
Ellen Langer				
Margaret Morgan Lawrence	1914–2019			
Alice Lee	1859–1939			
Averil Leimon		Positive psych.		
Jerre Levy				
Miriam Lewin	1931–2014			
Rachel Liebert	1981–present			
Marsha Linehan	1943–present	Clinical psychology	Known for her research into suicide and borderline personality disorder, culminating in her development of dialectical behaviour therapy.	
Hilary Lips	1949–present			
Jane Loevinger	1918–2008			
Elizabeth Loftus	1944–present	Cognitive psychology	Known for her pioneering work on the malleability of memory, including misinformation effect and false memories.	
Bernice Lott	1930–present	Social psychology		
Brinton Lykes	1949–present			

== M ==
Surnames beginning with M
Name	Lifetime	Field	Comments	Refs.
Eleanor Maccoby	1917–2018	Developmental psych.	Noted for her contributions to the fields of developmental psychology and gender studies.	
Karen Machover	1902–1996			
Catriona Macleod	1964–present	Feminist Psych		
Eva Magnusson	1947–present			
Margaret Mahler	1897–1985			
Jean Matter Mandler				
Jeanne Marecek	1946–present			
Elizabeth Holloway Marston	1893–1993			
Lillien Jane Martin	1851–1943			
Clara Mayo	1931–1981	Social psychology		
Harriette Pipes McAdoo	1940–2009			
Katharine Elizabeth McBride	1904–1976	Neuropsychology		
Martha McClintock	1947–present			
Sally-Anne McCormack		Clinical psych.		
Myrtle McGraw	1899–1988			
Maureen McHugh	1952–present			
Martha Mednick	1929–2020	Clinical psychology		
Gertrud Meili-Dworetzki	1912–1995			
Rivka Bertisch Meir				
Esther Menaker	1907–2003			
Maud Amanda Merrill	1888–1978			
Shari Miles-Cohen	1964–present			
Alice Miller	1923–2010			
Arlyn Miller	1925–2013			
Brenda Milner	1918–present	Neuropsych.	Sometimes referred to as "the founder of neuropsychology".	
Mildred B. Mitchell	1903–1983			
Geraldine Moane	1956–present			
Maria Montessori	1870–1952		Physician and educator best known for the Montessori education philosophy, and her writing on scientific pedagogy.	
Kate Gordon Moore	1878–1963			
Jill Morawski	?–present			
Tracy Morison	1981–present	Feminist psych.		
Krista Muis	?–present	Educational psych.	Canada Research Chair in epistemic cognition and self-regulated learning	
Lois Barclay Murphy	1902–2003			

== N ==
Surnames beginning with N
Name	Lifetime	Field	Comments	Refs.
Leola Neal	1911–1995			
Saundra M. Nettles	1947–present			
Bernice Neugarten	1916–2001			
Elaine Nicholson	?–present	Counselling psychology		
Paula Nicolson	1949–present			
Susan A. Nolan	1968–present			
Susan Nolen-Hoeksema	1959–2013			
Naomi Norsworthy	1877–1916			
Mary Northway	1909–1987			

== O ==
Surnames beginning with O
Name	Lifetime	Field	Comments	Refs.
Gamze Ongan	1958–present			
Joy Osofsky	?–present	Clinical and Developmental Psychology	Some of her notable work has examined the aftereffects of Hurricane Katrina, experiences of children raised in broken households, and the impact of the COVID-19 pandemic on communities.	
Lise Østergaard	1924–1996	Clinical psych.	Became Denmark's first professor of clinical psychology in 1963. She was later elected to the Danish parliament in 1979, before returning to her position at the University of Copenhagen in 1984.	
Maria Ovsiankina			See Maria Rickers-Ovsiankina	

== P ==
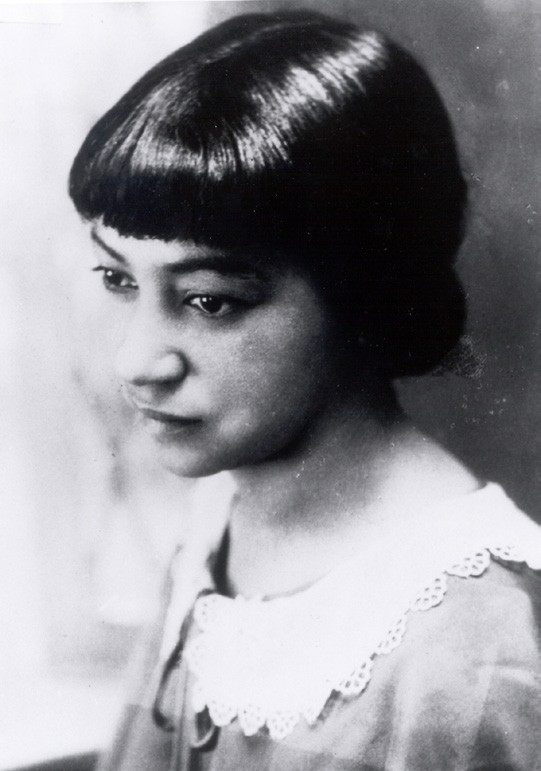
Inez Beverly Prosser (1924)

Surnames beginning with P
Name	Lifetime	Field	Comments	Refs.
Linda Papadopoulos	1971–present			
Mary Parlee	1943–2018			
Celestia Susannah Parrish	1853–1918			
Janis Paterson	?–present	Developmental psychology	One of the founding directors of the longitudinal Pacific Islands Families Study.	
Carolyn R. Payton	1925–2001		The first woman director, as well as the first African-American director, of the Peace Corps.	
Helen Peak	1900–1985			
Cheves Perky	1874–1940		Developed "The Perky Effect", which examines the link between mental imagery and visual perception.	
Anne Petersen				
Eva Bendix Petersen				
Jean Pettifor	1922–2015			
Hanna Pickard	1972–present	Moral psych.	Bloomberg Distinguished Professor of Philosophy and Bioethics.	
Reva Potashin	1921–present			
Carmen Poulin	1958–present			
LeShawndra Price				
Inez Beverly Prosser	1895–1934		First African-American woman to earn a PhD in psychology. She is known for her studies involving the possible differences in the personality and self-esteem of African-American youth attending segregated versus integrated schools.	
Lorine Pruette	1896–1976			
Sandra Pyke	?–present			

== Q–R ==
Surnames beginning with Q and R
Name	Lifetime	Field	Comments	Refs.
Marian Radke-Yarrow	1918–2007			
H. Lorraine Radtke	1952–present			
Gertrude Rand	1886–1970			
Rosalie Rayner	1898–1935			
Elaine Reese	?–present		Psychology professor. Her specialty is early language acquisition.	
Jean Rhodes	?–present	Clinical psych.	Frank L. Boyden Professor of Psychology in the clinical psychology division at the University of Massachusetts Boston.	
Maria Rickers-Ovsiankina	1898–1993			
Stephanie Riger	1946–present			
Sylvia Rimm	1935–present			
Michele Ritterman		Clinical psych.; Family therapy		
Anne Roe	1904–1991			
Natalie Rogers	1928–2015			
Wendy Stainton Rogers	1946–present	Health psych. Critical psych.		
Maria Root	1955–present	Clinical psychology		
Eleanor Rosch				
Erin Ross	1956–present			
Esther Rothblum	1955–present			
Frances Rousmaniere	1876–1964			
Lisa Rubin	1975–present			
Susanna Rubinstein	1847–1914			
Nora Ruck	1981–present			
Nancy Felipe Russo	1943–present			
Michelle Ryan				

== S ==
Surnames beginning with S
Name	Lifetime	Field	Comments	Refs.
Jeanne Safer				
Eleanor Saffran		Cognitive neuropsych.		
Janis Sanchez-Hucles	1951–present			
Bernice Resnick Sandler	1928–2019			
Virginia Satir				
Elizabeth Scarborough	1935–2015			
Janina Scarlet	1983–present	Clinical psychology; Psychotherapy	Known for superhero therapy, a technique which incorporates pop culture references about superheroes into psychotherapy	
Margot Scherl	1952–present			
Sanda Schmidjell	1962–present			
Pauline Sears	1908–1993	Educational psychology		
Denise Sekaquaptewa	1965–present			
Charlene Senn	1960–present			
Felicisima Serafica	1932–2019			
Deborah Serani				
Lisa Serbin	1946–present			
Seham Sergiwa	1963–present	Clinical psychology	Elected to the Libyan parliament in 2014. Abducted by the Libyan National Army in 2019, whereabouts currently unknown.	
Georgene Seward	1902–1992	Feminist psychology		
Virginia Staudt Sexton	1916–1997			
Roz Shafran	1970–present	Pediatric psychology	Known for pioneering research on perfectionism	
Francine Shapiro				
Tamara Sher		Clinical psych.		
Carolyn Wood Sherif	1922–1982			
Sara Shettleworth				
Stephanie Shields	1949–present			
Milicent Shinn	1858–1940	Child psych.		
Margaret Signorella	1952–present			
Louise Silverstein	1946–present			
Amy Singer				
Marie Skodak Crissey	1910–2000	Developmental psych.; School psych.	Served as president of two divisions of the American Psychological Association. Received the 1968 Joseph P. Kennedy Award for Research in Mental Retardation.	
Margaret Keiver Smith	1846–1934			
Theodate Smith	1860–1914			
Florence Snodgrass	1902–1997			
Elizabeth Spelke				
Janet Taylor Spence	1923–2015		Spent most of her career researching and contributing towards gender-related issues, especially involving women.	
Sabina Spielrein	1885 OS – 1942			
Cannie Stark	1945–present			
Christine Stephens	?–present	Health psych. Ageing	Top-rated New Zealand Psychologist, best known for establishing the International Society for Critical Health Psychology with fellow New Zealanders Kerry Chamberlain and Antonia Lyons.	
Clara Stern	1877–1945	Developmental psych.	Together with husband William Stern, published findings from their detailed diaries about their three children.	
Muriel Stern	1918–1991			
Abigail J. Stewart	1949–present			
Lois Meek Stolz	1891–1984			
Janet Stoppard	1945–present			
Bonnie Strickland	1936–present			
Christine Stromberger	1949–present			
Noreen Stuckless	1940–present			

== T ==
Surnames beginning with T
Name	Lifetime	Field	Comments	Refs.
Catherine Tamis-LeMonda	?–present	Applied psych.; Developmental psych		
Sandra Schwartz Tangri	1937–2003			
Amy Tanner	1870–1956			
Lucilia Tavares	?–present			
Shelley E. Taylor	1946–present	Social neuroscience		
Clara Thompson	1893–1958			
Sharon Thompson-Schill				
Thelma Thurstone	1897–1993			
Leonore Tiefer	1944–present			
Ethel Tobach	1921–2015			
Deborah Tolman	?–present	Developmental psychology		
Ruth Tolman	1893–1957			
Anne Treisman	1935–2018	Cognitive psych.		
Reiko True	1933–present		Recognized for her efforts to advance mental health services for Asian Americans and other minorities in the US.	
Jeanne Tsai				
Alberta Banner Turner	1909–2008			
Leona Tyler	1906–1993			

== U ==
Surnames beginning with U
Name	Lifetime	Field	Comments	Refs.
Vindhya Undurti	1955–present	Feminist psych.		
Rhoda Unger	1939–2019	Feminist psych.		
Jane Ussher	?–present			

== V ==
Surnames beginning with V
Name	Lifetime	Field	Comments	Refs.
Sari van Anders	1978–present			
Melba J. T. Vasquez	1951–present			
Star Vega	1949–2004	Multicultural psychology		
Magdalen Dorothea Vernon	1901–1991			
Helen Verrall	1883–1959			
Vaira Vīķe-Freiberga	1937–present		Had a decades-long career at the University of Montreal in Canada, before being elected Latvia's first woman president.	
Margareta Anna Vobruba	1951–present	Psychoanalysis		
Marie-Louise von Franz	1915–1998	Analytical psych.		
Hedwig von Restorff	1906–1962		Established the presence of perceptual features as differences by measuring their effect on recall (the von Restorff Effect).	
Beverly J. Vandiver	?–present	Black psychology	Led development of the Cross Racial Identity Scale. Editor-in-Chief of the Journal of Black Psychology.	

== W ==
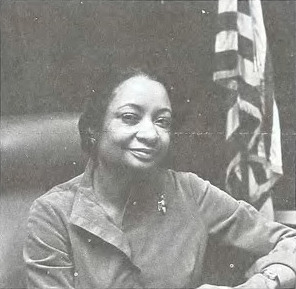
Joan Scott Wallace (photo published 1977)

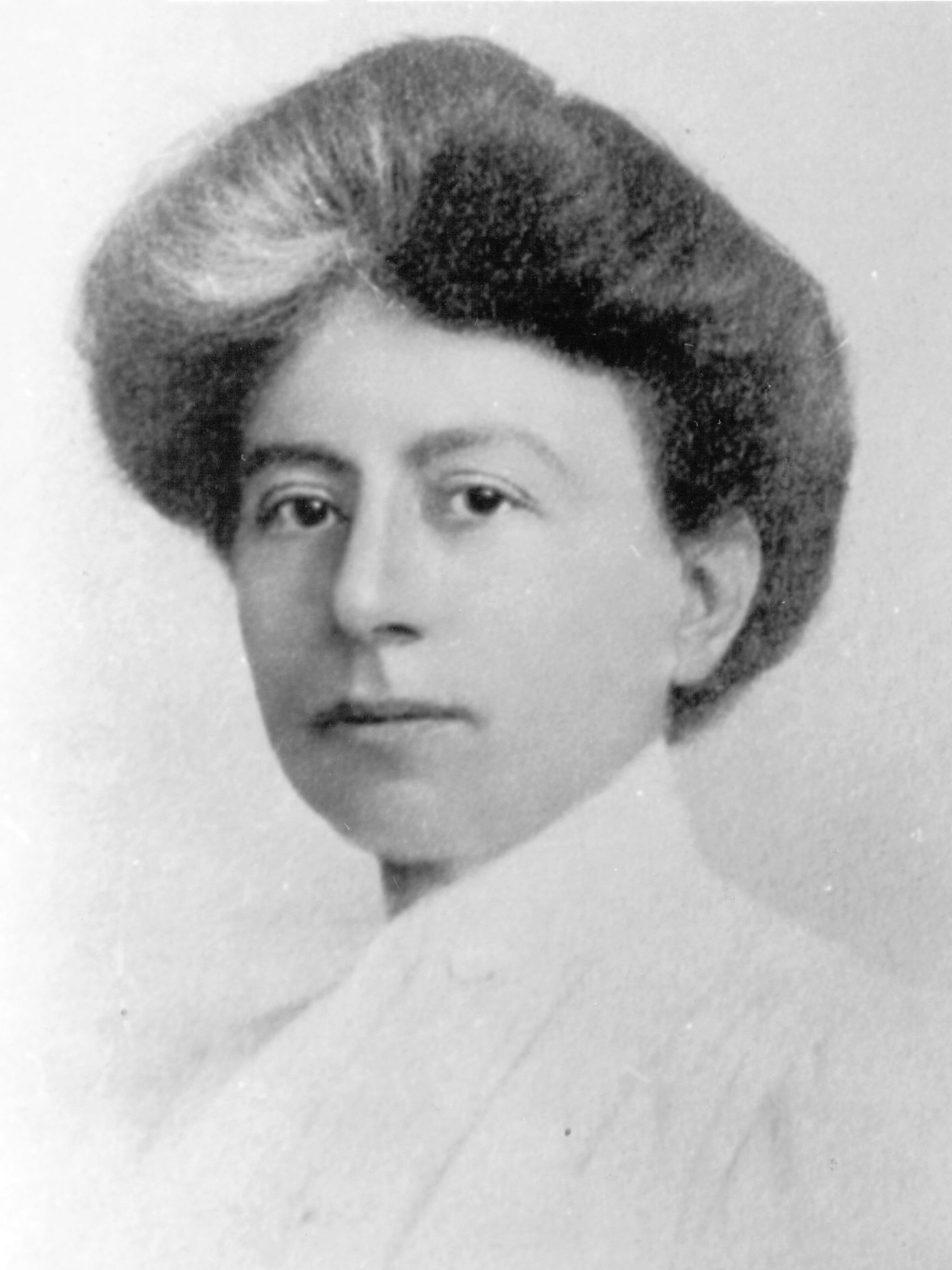
Margaret Floy Washburn (early 1900s)

Surnames beginning with W
Name	Lifetime	Field	Comments	Refs.
Joan Scott Wallace	1930–2018			
Barbara Strudler Wallston	1943–1987			
Mary Roth Walsh	1939–1998			
Margaret Floy Washburn	1871–1939		Studied sensation and perception and theorized that one's consciousness was responsible for their own motor activities. She was the first American woman to receive a PhD in psychology.	
Nicole Weekes				
Naomi Weisstein	1939–2015			
Susan Weinschenk	1953–present	Behavioural psychology		
Louise Thompson Welch	1916–2004			
Beth Wellman	1895–1952			
Beate West-Leuer	1951–present	Psychoanalysis		
Aaronette White	1961–2012			
Keturah Whitehurst	1912–2000	Clinical psychology; Developmental psychology		
Blossom Wigdor	1924–2025			
Sue Wilkinson	1954–present			
Lillie Williams	1854–1923			
Carla Willig	1964–present			
Theta Holmes Wolf	1904–1997			
Helen Thompson Woolley	1874–1947		Noted for her work in gender studies. She was the first to research gender differences in a truly scientific and experimental way.	
Judith Worell	1928–present	Clinical psychology		
Beatrice A. Wright	1917–2018			
Marion MacDonald Wright	?–2015			
Mary J. Wright	1915–2014			
Gail E. Wyatt	1944–present	Clinical psych.; Sex therapy	She is known for her research on consensual and abusive sexual relationships and their influence on psychological well-being, and creation of culturally appropriate measures. She was also the first African American woman in the state of California to receive a license to practice psychology.	
Karen Wyche	?–present			
Karen Wynn	?–present			

== X–Z ==
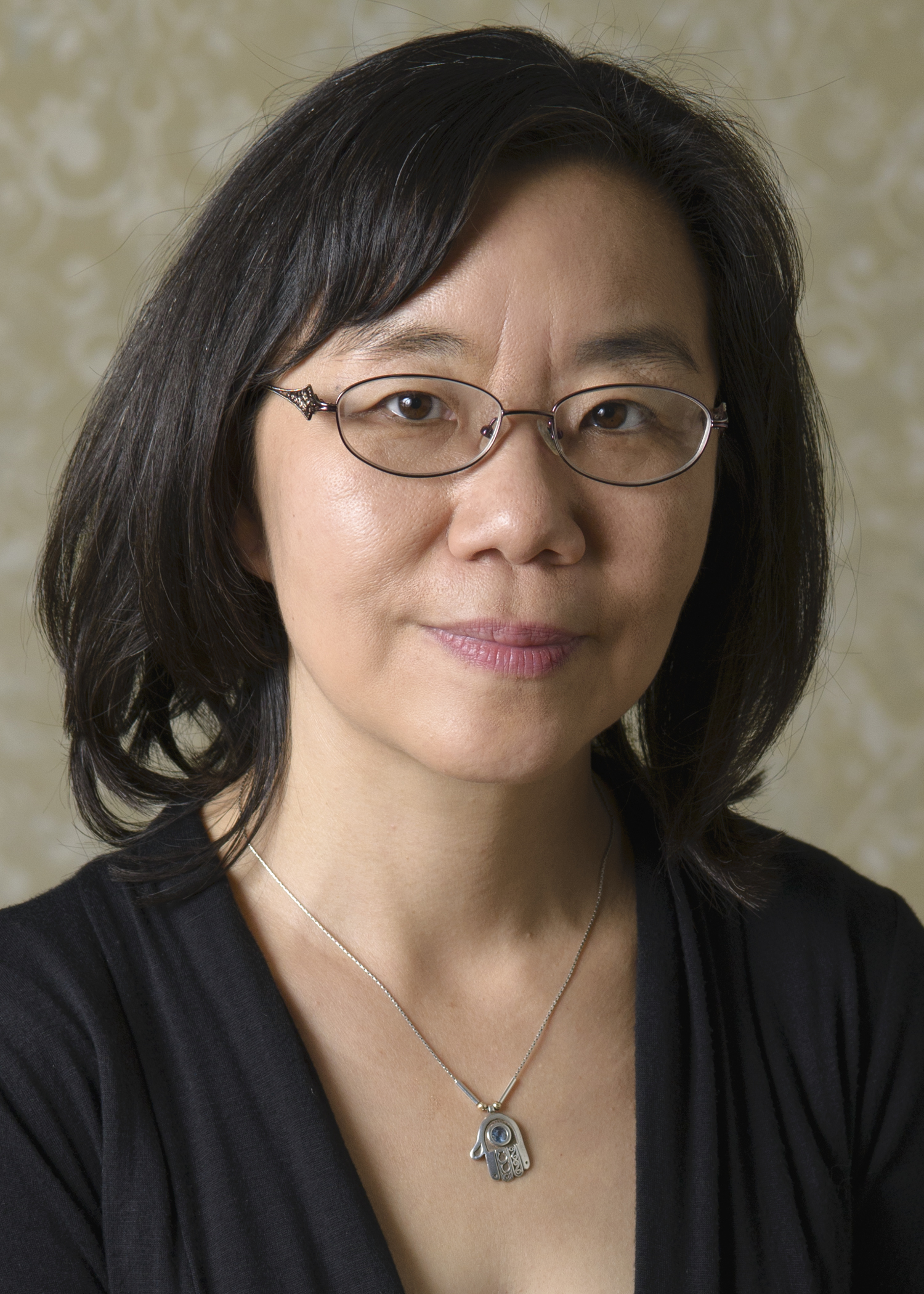
Fei Xu (2014)

Surnames beginning with X, Y and Z
Name	Lifetime	Field	Comments	Refs.
Fei Xu	1969–present			
Rivka Yahav	1950–present	Psychotherapy		
Janice Yoder	1952–present	Feminist psychology	Research into the experiences of token individuals - those in a career where they are not of the traditional gender. including the difference between the experiences of women in traditionally masculine careers (who struggle to attain recognition and success) versus men in traditionally feminine careers (who are able to find success far more easily), and the impact of race on experiences of women in traditionally masculine careers.	
Sue Rosenberg Zalk	1945–2001	Developmental psychology; Feminist psychology		
Bluma Zeigarnik	1901–1988		Most notable for her discovery of the Zeigarnik effect, where forgotten incomplete tasks are better remembered than complete ones.	
