= Cynthia de las Fuentes =

American counseling psychologist (born 1964)

- Born: 1964 (age 61–62); Chula Vista, California, U.S.
- Education: University of Texas at Austin
- Children: 2
- Scientific career
- Fields: Counseling psychology
- Workplaces: Our Lady of the Lake University
- Doctoral advisor: Lucia Albino Gilbert; Melba J. T. Vasquez

Cynthia de las Fuentes (born 1964) is an American counseling psychologist serving as the 2024 president of the American Psychological Association (APA). During her career, she has focused on ethics in psychology, feminist and multicultural therapy, and advocacy for Latinx and immigrant communities. De las Fuentes was an associate professor at Our Lady of the Lake University from 1993 to 2007.

== Early life and education ==
Cynthia de las Fuentes was born in 1964 and raised in a Mexican American family. She was the first person on either side of her family to pursue graduate education. Her interest in psychology developed during an AP Psychology class in high school and was influenced by her maternal grandfather, who respected the field despite limited formal education. In 1984, De las Fuentes earned a B.A. in Educational Psychology at the University of Texas at Austin in two years. At UT Austin's College of Education she continued her studies to complete a Ph.D. in counseling psychology in 1994. Her dissertation was titled, Ethical Decision-Making in Faculty-Student Multiple Relationships. Her doctoral advisors were Lucia Albino Gilbert and Melba J. T. Vasquez.

De las Fuentes was a congressional fellow with the Women’s Research and Education Institute from 1989 to 1990 and a Public Interest Directorate Fellow at the American Psychological Association (APA) in 1990. Her predoctoral internship was completed at the University of California, Irvine, from 1992 to 1993.

== Career ==
De las Fuentes joined Our Lady of the Lake University in 1993, earning tenure in 2002 and serving as an associate professor until 2007. She held multiple roles, including practicum and internship coordinator, interim program coordinator for the M.S. in school psychology and counseling, and director of training for the Psy.D. program, obtaining tenure in 2002. During this period, she developed a focus on ethics training, feminist therapy, and multicultural psychology, with a strong emphasis on Latinx populations. She was involved with the National Latinx Psychological Association and is a founding member. Her teaching included graduate courses in Latino psychology, multicultural psychology, and applied ethics, aligning with her ongoing research and publications in these areas.

De las Fuentes published works on multicultural competence, feminist ethical practices, and culturally informed forensic evaluations, including a 2005 publication on competency training in ethics for professional psychology. Her 2007 work, “Applying the Multicultural Competency Guidelines to Latina/o Populations,” further explored the cultural genogram as a strategy in clinical training and practice. She was also active in presenting her research at conferences, including a 2006 APA summit on immigration, co-chairing the event to address the psychological impacts of immigration. De las Fuentes has been involved in professional organizations. She served as president of the APA’s society for the psychology of women (Division 35) from 2005 to 2006 and represented Division 45, society for the psychological study of culture, ethnicity, and race, on the APA council of representatives from 2017 to 2018. She also held editorial positions for journals such as Psychology of Women Quarterly and Professional Psychology: Research and Practice. In these roles, she contributed to scholarly discourse on multicultural issues and ethics, focusing on the integration of cultural sensitivity in psychological practice.

From 1997 to 2015, de las Fuentes participated in the Austin Women’s Psychotherapy Project. Since 2007, she has conducted an independent psychology practice in Austin, Texas, where she specializes in feminist and multicultural therapy, as well as forensic evaluations and consultation for immigrant communities. Her practice focuses on a range of issues, including racial identity, gender, and sexual orientation, in line with her research interests and her advocacy for culturally competent therapy.

In 2023, de las Fuentes was elected president of the APA, with her term as president commencing in 2024. Her career includes significant involvement in the APA, where she has held multiple leadership positions, including chair of the committee on women in psychology in 2012 and service on the APA council of representatives. In 2024, de las Fuentes advocated for the prohibition of punitive isolation of minors within the juvenile justice system. Additionally, in 2024, de las Fuentes also appointed Evelyn Burrell, Tamara Morris, and Christopher Nguyen to the Advocacy Coordinating Committee for the APA.

== Personal life ==
In her free time Cynthia dedicates time to community service. She hosts self care workshops for lawyers who specialize in immigration as well as stress management training for their staff. De las Fuentes adopted two daughters. She has a background in voice performance, which she pursued from childhood through graduate school, performing in her first opera at age 14. Her personal interests include reading, cooking, and watching Korean dramas.
