= Machover =

Machover is a surname. Notable people with the surname include:

- Daniel Machover, British lawyer
- Karen Machover (1902–1996), Belarus-born American psychologist
- Moshé Machover (born 1936), British mathematician
- Solomon Machover (1906–1976), American psychologist
- Tod Machover (born 1953), American composer
