= McAdow =

McAdow is a surname. It is a variant of the surname McAdoo. Notable people with the surname include:

- Clara McAdow (1838–1896), American women's suffragist and mine owner
- Maurice McAdow (1904–2001), American conductor, trumpeter, and music educator
- Samuel McAdow (1760–1844), American Presbyterian minister
