= McAdoo =

McAdoo may refer to:

== People ==
- McAdoo (surname)

== U.S. places ==
- McAdoo Township, Barber County, Kansas
- McAdoo, Pennsylvania
- McAdoo, Texas

== See also ==
- USS Grumium (AK-112/AVS-3), laid down as the SS William G. McAdoo.
