= Lucinda Pearl Boggs =

American psychologist

- Born: November 18, 1874; Hayes, Illinois, U.S.
- Died: 1931 (aged 56–57)
- Scientific career
- Fields: Philosophy, Psychology

Lucinda Pearl Boggs (November 18, 1874 – 1931) was an American psychologist and philosopher who is known for her work in the field of child development, as well as for her contributions to the study of women in China.

== Biography ==
Boggs was born November 18, 1874, in Hayes, Illinois, the daughter of Benjamin Franklin Boggs and Mary Jane (Armstrong) Boggs.

Boggs received her B.A. in 1894 from University of Illinois Urbana-Champaign and between 1894 and 1897 she taught at Rice Collegiate Institute in Paxton, IL. She began studying for her doctorate at the University of Jena in Jena, Germany, but transferred to the University of Halle, where she wrote her thesis "John Dewey's Theory of Interest and its Application in Pedagogy". She received her PhD from the University of Halle in 1900.

After receiving her PhD, she taught psychology at Washington State Normal School between 1901 and 1902, after which she was an honorary fellow in psychology and philosophy at Cornell from 1902 to 1903.

She was a professor of philosophy and psychology Western College for Women (1905–1908) and also taught at University of Illinois Urbana-Champaign (c1905-1906, c1915, c1922).

Boggs participated in an educational mission in China from 1910 to 1912.

She adopted a daughter, Rosalind Emma, born on February 23, 1913.

== Selected publications ==
- Boggs, Lucinda Pearl (1905). "How Children Learn to Read: An experimental study". The Pedagogical Seminary. 12 (4): 496–502. doi:10.1080/08919402.1905.10534675.
- Boggs, Lucinda Pearl (1905-12-07). "The Psychical Complex Called an Interest". Journal of Philosophy, Psychology and Scientific Methods. 2 (25): 681–687. doi:10.2307/2010931. JSTOR 2010931.
- Boggs, Lucinda Pearl (1906-08-16). "The Relation of Feeling and Interest". Journal of Philosophy, Psychology and Scientific Methods. 3 (17): 462–466. doi:10.2307/2012289. JSTOR 2012289.
- Lucinda Pearl Boggs, "The Psychology of the Learning Process," The Journal of Philosophy, Psychology and Scientific Methods 4, No. 18 (Aug. 29, 1907), pp. 477–481
- L. Pearl Boggs, "Review of The Psychological Experiences connected with the Different Parts of Speech, by Eleanor H. Rowland, The Psychological Review, Monograph Supplement, January, 1907. Pp. 42.", The Journal of Philosophy, Psychology and Scientific Methods 5, Issue 2, (Jan. 1908), pp. 52–53.
- Boggs, Lucinda Pearl (January 1913). "The Position of Women in China". Popular Science Monthly. 82.
- Boggs, Lucinda Pearl (1913). Chinese Womanhood: With a Foreword by T. S. Wentworth. Cincinnati, Ohio: Jennings and Graham.
- Boggs, Lucinda Pearl (1922-01-05). "A Partial Analysis of Faith". Journal of Philosophy. 19 (1): 15–24. doi:10.2307/2939683. JSTOR 2939683.
- Boggs, Lucinda Pearl (1922-11-23). "Review of An Introduction to Psychology by Susan S. Brierley". The Journal of Philosophy. 19 (24): 666–667. doi:10.2307/2939429. JSTOR 2939429.

== See also ==
- List of women psychologists
