= WCPA =

WCPA may refer to:

== Organizations ==
- World Constitution and Parliament Association
- World Commission on Protected Areas
- Wendouree Centre for the Performing Arts
- Woman's Club of Palo Alto
- Women’s Committee for Political Action
- Workingmen's Co-operative Publishing Association
- Window Covering Professionals of America
- Wendouree Centre for Performing Arts

== Media ==
- WCPA (AM), an AM radio station located in Clearfield, Pennsylvania
