= Mary E. Reuder =

American experimental psychologist, statistician

- Born: 1923
- Died: 2017 (aged 93–94)
- Occupation: Professor of Psychology
- Spouse: Marvin A. Iverson

Academic background
- Education: College of St. Catherine; Brown University; University of Pennsylvania

Academic work
- Institutions: Queens College, CUNY

Mary E. Reuder (1923 – 2017) was an American experimental psychologist, statistician, and licensed clinical psychologist known for her involvement in the American Psychological Association (APA) and her active mentorship of women in psychology. Reuder was the former chairperson of the Psychology Department of Queens College, City University of New York and a member of the faculty at Queens College for three decades.

Reuder served as President of APA Division 1 (Society for General Psychology), and APA Division 36 (Psychology for the Psychology of Religion and Spirituality), and was a Fellow of seven of the APA divisions (1, 2, 3, 6, 32, 36, and 52).

Reuder was co-editor of A Handbook for Women Mentors: Transcending Barriers of Stereotype, Race, and Ethnicity, which aimed to provide a practical guide to help women be effective mentors to other women in academia or in professional careers.

== Biography ==
Reuder was born March 12, 1923, in Minneapolis, Minnesota. She received her Bachelors of Science from the College of St. Catherine in St. Paul, MN in 1944. She continued education by completing a Master's degree at Brown University in 1945, and a PhD in Psychology at the University of Pennsylvania in 1951. After graduating, she worked for the United States Navy as a management specialist and as research psychologist for the Department of the Army.

Reuder was a member of the faculty in the Department of Psychology at Queens College, CUNY from 1954 until her retirement in 1986. As an experimental psychologist, her research focused on varied topics including magnitude estimation, associative learning, tactile discrimination, and effects of orientation (ego vs. task) on problem solving. Reuder also coauthored several papers with her husband, social psychologist Marvin A. Iverson. Iverson died as a consequence of an aneurysm in 1979 at age 55.

Reuder died of natural causes on November 15, 2017, in Milford, Pennsylvania.

== Florence L. Denmark and Mary E. Reuder Award ==
APA Division 52 (International Psychology) established the Florence L. Denmark and Mary E. Reuder Award in 2003 to recognize and encourage outstanding psychologists who have made international contributions to further the understanding the development of women and/or gender. The award is named for Denmark and Reuder who were charter members of Division 52 and recognized for their scholarly contributions, international outlook, and mentoring. Recipients include Ellyn Kaschak, Sharon Horne, M. Brinton Lykes, and Oliva Espín.
