= Ross Speck =

Ross V. Speck, MD (1927–2015), was an American psychiatrist, psychoanalyst and family therapist. He had a strong interest in sociology and anthropology and did research in family therapy of schizophrenia, drugs, depression, and adolescents. He was one of the "first generation" of family therapists and a founder of the Family Institute of Philadelphia. In addition, he was the originator of NetWork Therapy.

== Career ==
A native of St. Catharines, Ontario, Canada, Speck received his medical degree in 1951 from the University of Toronto. He taught at Thomas Jefferson University and Hahnemann Medical College in Philadelphia and at The Union Institute, Cincinnati, Ohio. He became a U.S. citizen in 1957, while working at Brooke Army Medical Center. He was on the faculty of the International R.D. Laing Institute in St. Gallen, Switzerland, and was a friend of Laing's. He was a life fellow of the American Psychiatric Association. In the 1960s, he founded the Family Institute of Philadelphia, in the neighborhood of Spring Garden. He also was the Eastern Pennsylvania Psychiatric Institute clinical director from 1958 to 1964, a psychiatry professor at Hahnemann Medical College from 1960 to 1970, and worked as a researcher at the Philadelphia Psychiatric Center from 1966 to 1972. In September 1969, he coined the concept of Network Therapy in an article co-written with Uri Rueveni.

Among his books are Family Networks (1972; with Carolyn Attneave) and The New Families (1972). He served on the editorial board of the journals Family Process, Journal of Psychotherapy and the Family and Journal of Family Psychotherapy. Speck also worked as a Thomas Jefferson University part-time clinical professor of psychiatry from 1980 to 1990, and was a professor at the Union Institute in Cincinnati from 1980 to 1993.

He died at his home in Thorofare, New Jersey on May 23, 2015.

== Personal life ==
Speck was married to psychotherapist Joan Kendig Gill, daughter of Isabelle Kendig and Howard Belding Gill, and was later known as Joan Lincoln Speck or Joan Speck. He had four sons and three daughters, along with two stepsons, and was previously married to a woman named Margaret.

== See also ==
- Family therapy
- Social work

== Bibliography ==
- Speck, R.V. & Attneave, C. (1972). Family Networks New York: Pantheon.
- Speck, R.V. (1972). The New Families: youth, communes, and the politics of drugs. New York: Basic Books.
- Speck, R.V. (2003). Social Network Intervention. In Sholevar, G.P. & Schwoeri, L.D. (Eds.) Textbook of Family and Couples Therapy: Clinical Applications. Washington, DC: American Psychiatric Publishing Inc.
