= Janis Paterson =

New Zealand academic (1945–2024)

- Born: Janis Eileen McLachlan; 4 October 1945
- Died: 10 May 2024 (aged 78)
- Education: University of Auckland
- Known for: Pacific Islands Families longitudinal study
- Scientific career
- Fields: Developmental psychology
- Workplaces: Auckland University of Technology
- Thesis: Adolescent perceptions of attachment: parents, friends, and impact on self esteem (1993)

Janis Eileen Paterson (née McLachlan; 4 October 1945 – 10 May 2024) was a New Zealand psychologist and academic who was a professor at the Auckland University of Technology.

After a 1993 PhD titled Adolescent perceptions of attachment: parents, friends, and impact on self esteem at the University of Auckland, Paterson moved to Auckland University of Technology, where she worked for more than 20 years.

Paterson was a founder of the Pacific Islands Families study, a longitudinal study following 1000 children born in South Auckland in 2000 to families of Pacific Island descent. The study aims to collect data on the health and socio-economic well-being of the children and their families as they grow through the key developmental stages. Paterson and Collin Tukuitonga were the study's founding directors.

Paterson died on 10 May 2024, at the age of 78.

== Selected works ==
- Paterson, Janis, Jan Pryor, and Jeff Field. "Adolescent attachment to parents and friends in relation to aspects of self-esteem." Journal of Youth and Adolescence 24, no. 3 (1995): 365–376.
- Paterson, Janis E., Jeff Field, and Jan Pryor. "Adolescents' perceptions of their attachment relationships with their mothers, fathers, and friends." Journal of Youth and Adolescence 23, no. 5 (1994): 579–600.
- Paterson, Janis, Colin Tukuitonga, Max Abbott, Michael Feehan, Phil Silva, Teuila Percival, Sarnia Carter et al. "Pacific Islands Families: First two years of life study--design and methodology." New Zealand Medical Journal 119, no. 1228 (2006).
- Butler, Sarnia, Maynard Williams, Colin Tukuitonga, and Janis Paterson. "Problems with damp and cold housing among Pacific families in New Zealand." New Zealand Medical Journal 116, no. 1177 (2003).
- Paterson, Janis, Teuila Percival, Philip Schluter, Gerhard Sundborn, Max Abbott, Sarnia Carter, Esther Cowley-Malcolm, Jim Borrows, Wanzhen Gao, and PIF Study Group. "Cohort profile: The Pacific Islands Families (PIF) Study." International Journal of Epidemiology 37, no. 2 (2007): 273–279.
