= Oliva Espín =

Cuban American clinical psychologist

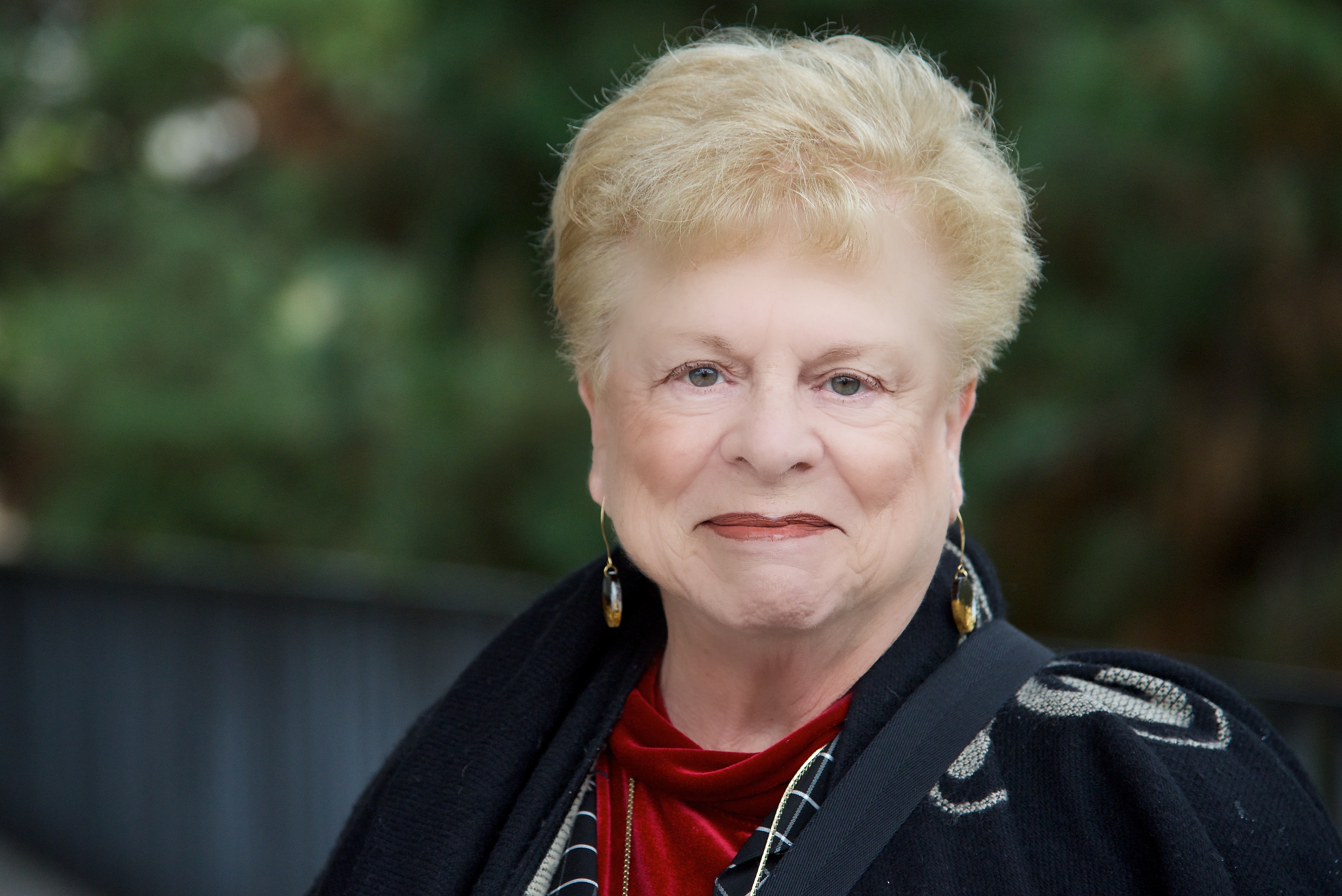
- Citizenship: Cuban American
- Occupation: Psychologist
- Awards: APA Award for Distinguished Professional Contributions to Public Service (1991); AWP Distinguished Career Award (2001); APA Outstanding International Psychologist (2010); APA Outstanding Lifetime Contributions to Psychology (2025)

Academic background
- Education: BA, University of Costa Rica; PhD, University of Florida; Post doctoral training, National Institute of Mental Health fellowship at Harvard University

Academic work
- Institutions: Boston University; San Diego State University

Oliva Maria Espín (born December 12, 1938) is a Cuban American counseling psychologist known for her pioneering intellectual contributions to feminist therapy, immigration, and women's studies, and her advocacy on behalf of refugee women to help them to gain access to mental health services. Her interdisciplinary scholarly work brings together perspectives from sociology, politics, and religion to further understanding of issues and barriers related to gender, sexuality, language, and race. She is in the vanguard of transnational psychology, that applies transnational feminist lenses to the field of psychology to study, understand, and address the impact of colonization, imperialism, and globalization. She is the first Latina Professor Emerita of Women’s Studies at San Diego State University.

== Awards ==
Espín was the 2025 recipient of the Outstanding Lifetime Contributions to Psychology American Psychological Association (APA) and the Award for Distinguished Professional Contributions to Public Service in 1991 also from the APA. Her award citations emphasized that she "worked forcefully to advance cross-cultural communication, gender issues, human sexuality, international awareness, and cultural factors as critical elements in the knowledge base of psychology." They also emphasize that "Espín was at the forefront of a profound epistemological shift in psychology. Her compelling narratives gave voice to the voiceless using qualitative methodologies when the dominant culture of psychology valued only quantitative research approaches. Her work has always been interdisciplinary, involving psychology, sociology, politics, law, and religion. At the forefront of transnational psychology, her writings have confronted the impact of colonization, imperialism, and globalization on women of the Global South. Espín has authored 10 books and more than 40 journal articles and book chapters, served on the editorial boards of four psychology journals, and mentored journal editors and authors." "

Espín received the 2001 Distinguished Career Award and the 2008 Christine Ladd Franklin Award from the Association for Women in Psychology. (AWP). Since 2008, the AWP has awarded the Oliva Espín Award for Social Justice Concerns in Feminist Psychology to recognize the work of feminists who are making important contributions to practice, education and training.

Other prestigious awards include the 2006 Rosallee Weiss Award for Outstanding Leaders in Psychology from the American Psychological Foundation, and the 2006 Florence L. Denmark and Mary E. Reuder Award and the 2010 APA Outstanding International Psychologist Award, both from APA Division 52 (International Psychology).

Espin is a Fellow of both the American Psychological Association and the British Psychological Society.

== Biography ==
Espín was born December 12, 1938, in Santiago de Cuba. In 1961, she left Cuba and began her life as an immigrant to Spain, Panama, Costa Rica, and eventually the United States. Espín completed a BA at the Universidad De Costa Rica in 1969 and a PhD at the University of Florida in 1974. Early in her career she conducted a brief survey (in collaboration with Richard R. Renner) and created an annotated bibliography to inform counselors about the situation in Latin America. She completed post-doctoral training through a National Institutes of Mental Health fellowship at Harvard University (1981-1983).

Espín worked as an Interim professor in the Department of Counselor Education at McGill University (1974-1975) before moving to Boston University where she was a Clinical Professor in the Counseling Psychology Program (1975-1986). After four years as the Director of the Counseling Psychology Program at Tufts University (1986-1990), Espín moved to the Department of Women's Studies, San Diego State University, where she remained until her retirement in 2007 while also working part-time as Professor at the California School of Professional Psychology. In San Diego, Espin was part of a writers' group that included Lillian Faderman, Carolyn Marsden, Anne Marie Welsh and Abigail Padgett who encouraged her to write about memory and language. Other important colleagues who influenced her writing were Ellyn Kaschak and Natalie Porter.

== Books ==
- Cole, E., Rothblum, E. D., & Espín, O. M. (Eds.) (1992). Refugee women and their mental health: Shattered societies, shattered lives. Haworth Press.
- Espín, O. M. (Ed.) (1997). Latina realities: Essays on healing, migration, and sexuality . Westview Press.
- Espín, O. M. (1999). Women crossing boundaries: A psychology of immigration and transformations of sexuality. Routledge.
- Espín, O.M. (2020). My native land is memory: Stories of a Cuban childhood. San Diego: San Diego State University Press.
- Espín, O. M. (2020). Women, sainthood, and power: A feminist psychology of cultural constructions. Lexington Books.
- Espín, O. M. & Dottolo, A. L. (2015). Gendered journeys: Women, migration and feminist psychology . Palgrave MacMillan.
- Kawahara, D. M., & Espín, O. M. (Eds.). (2007). Feminist reflections on growth and transformation: Asian American women in therapy . Haworth Press.
- Kawahara, D. M., & Espín, O. M. (Eds.). (2013). Feminist therapy with Latina women: Personal and social voices . Routledge.
