= Karen Machover =

American psychologist (1902–1996)

- Born: Sophie Karen Alper; September 12, 1902; Minsk, Belarus
- Died: January 22, 1996 (aged 93)
- Occupation: Psychologist
- Notable work: Personality projection in the drawing of the human figure: A method of personality investigation, 1949
- Spouse: Solomon Machover (m. 1936)
- Children: 1

Sophie Karen Alper (September 12, 1902 – January 22, 1996) was a Russian-born American psychologist better known as Karen Machover.

== Early life and education ==
Sophie Karen Alper was born on September 12, 1902, in Minsk in the Russian Empire. She migrated to the Lower East Side of Manhattan, New York City, with her parents in 1910. Both her parents died by the time she was 8 years old. With little assistance from relatives, she was self-supporting by the age of 12. She graduated from elementary school with honors at the age of 12 and completed a high school equivalency. She earned a bachelor of arts from New York University in 1929 and a master of arts from the New York University School of Education. She conducted doctoral studies at Columbia University in the mid-1930s but never completed the degree.

== Career ==
As a young clinician at Bellevue Hospital, Machover (then: Karen Alper) collaborated with other Marxist activists to found the Psychologists League. It was a Popular Front group with liberal, socialist and communist members that agitated for jobs and better treatment for psychologists

Late in her career, Machover embraced feminism and rejected Freudian Theory which she had previously embraced.

== Personal life ==
Alper married Solomon Machover in 1936. Together, they had one son, Robert Machover.

== Publications ==
- Personality Projection In The Drawing Of The Human Figure (A Method of Personality Investigation). CHARLES C. THOMAS • PUBLISHER. First Edition, First Printing, 1949; First Edition, Second Printing, 1950 Internet Archive Aces. aug. 2019

== See also ==
- Psychologists League
