= Carolyn Attneave =

American psychologist (1920–1992)

- Born: July 2, 1920; El Paso, Texas, United States
- Died: June 22, 1992 (aged 71)
- Education: Stanford University (M.A, Ph.D.); California State University, Chico (B.A.)
- Occupation: Clinical Psychologist

Carolyn Lewis Attneave (July 2, 1920 – June 22, 1992) was a Native American psychologist. She was the first Native American woman to earn a Ph.D. in psychology. Attneave was a pioneer of network therapy, an early form of systemic family therapy that emphasized the role of extended kinship and community in treatment.

Attneave was also a leading advocate for multicultural psychology and played a key role in the founding of the Society of Indian Psychologists and the American Psychological Association's Division 45, dedicated to the study of culture, ethnicity, and race. She worked initially for the Oklahoma State Department of Health providing mental health services to seven Native American tribes before she moved to Philadelphia to focus on network therapy as an alternative to hospitalisation. She was a founding member of the Boston Indian Council and what would become the Society of Indian Psychologists. She taught at Harvard University and the University of Washington. The American Psychological Association's Carolyn Attneave Diversity Award is awarded in her honour.

== Early life and education ==
Attneave was born in El Paso, Texas, to Scandinavian and Delaware Native American parents. Attneave spent most of her early years in South Texas, but frequently spent summers with her Delaware relatives in Oklahoma. Her culturally aware upbringing would go on to influence her decision to research diversity.

Attneave earned a bachelor's in English and Theatre at Chico State College in California in 1940. She would stay at Chico state College to earn another bachelor's in secondary education. After spending six years as a school teacher. She earned a master's degree in counseling psychology from Stanford in 1947 and a Ph.D. in clinical psychology in 1952, making her one of the first Native Americans to hold a doctorate in psychology.

During World War II, Attneave served in the United States Coast Guard Reserve, where she trained enlisted men. This experience sparked her interest in group dynamics and influenced her later work on network interventions.

== Career and research ==
Attneave was the first Native American woman who earned her Ph.D. in psychology and is arguably the most "well-known psychologist of American-Indian background." In 1962, Attneave relocated to Oklahoma to work for the Oklahoma State Department of Health, where she worked to provide mental health services to seven Native American tribes in the area. This work would go on to influence her later efforts to provide Native American-specific mental health treatment.

In 1968, she moved to Philadelphia, Pennsylvania, to work at the Child Guidance Clinic. It was here that she began to focus on network therapy, an alternative to the hospitalization in which the clients focus on their personal networks that may include their families and neighborhood communities. In an attempt to gain a better cultural understanding of the cultural contexts of her clients, she relocated to a primarily black area of Philadelphia, where she was able to understand different therapy networks.

In 1969, she published “Therapy in Tribal Settings and Urban Network Intervention” in the journal Family Process, introducing the concept of network therapy, which mobilized extended family and community ties in treatment. Her later article, “Core Network Intervention: An Emerging Paradigm” (1990), further developed these ideas by defining the “core network” of essential relationships that support individual well-being.

In 1973, her book Family Networks, written with Ross Speck, was published. It became a foundational text in family therapy.. Later, she moved to Boston, Massachusetts, where she was a founding member of the Boston Indian Council which held the title as the largest Indian council in the country. In 1970, Attneave founded, wrote, and edited the Network of Indian Psychologist that facilitated cultural resources for Indian communities. The Network of Indian Psychologist newsletter eventually grew into what is now known as the Society of Indian Psychologists.

Beginning in 1973, she began her teaching career at Harvard University's School of Public Health and later joined the faculty at the University of Washington, where she directed the university's American Indian Studies Program.

Attneave retired in 1980 where she continued to write, lecture, and travel until her death in 1992.

== Legacy ==
The Carolyn Attneave Diversity Award, given out annually by the American Psychological Association, is named after her and recognizes "the promotion of diversity in family psychology."

Her career has been recognized as laying the groundwork for contemporary multicultural psychology and culturally competent mental health care. Scholars have described her as the most well-known psychologist of American Indian background (Trimble & Clearing-Sky, 2009). Her emphasis on Indigenous models of healing anticipated later developments in community-based psychology and cultural humility.

In 2019, Stanford University’s Serra House where the Clayman Institute for Gender Research is located was renamed the Carolyn Lewis Attneave House. It was formerly named after Junípero Serra.
