= Elizabeth R. Douvan =

American psychologist

Elizabeth R. Douvan (1926–2002) was an American psychologist, being the Catherine Neaffie Kellogg Professor of Psychology and Women's Studies at University of Michigan.

== Education ==
- PhD, University of Michigan, (1951)
- AB, Vassar College, (1946)
