= Vindhya Undurti =

Feminist scholar

- Citizenship: Indian
- Occupation: Professor of Psychology
- Awards: Fulbright Scholar (2004); Association for Women in Psychology Distinguished Publication Award (2012)

Academic background
- Education: Andhra University

Vindhya Undurti (born 1955) is a feminist scholar known for her research on gender roles, women's health, and gender based violence, and for her advocacy work on behalf of Indian women. Undurti is Professor of Psychology in the School of Gender Studies at the Tata Institute of Social Sciences in Hyderabad, India.

Undurti and her colleagues received the 2012 Distinguished Publication Award from the Association for Women in Psychology for their work in editing the Handbook of International Feminisms: Perspectives on Psychology, Women, Culture and Rights. She was previously awarded the South Asian Visiting Scholarship at the University of Oxford in 1998 and a Fulbright Visiting Lecturer Fellowship in 2004. She is a past President of the National Academy of Psychology (India).

== Biography ==
Undurti was born on September 25, 1955, in Visakhapatnam, India. As the daughter of a college professor and a school teacher raised in a middle-class household, Undurti was allowed to pursue any academic field of her choosing. Although her education was not affected by gender discrimination and unjust treatment, the unfair gender norms were still apparent in the household and in the Indian society at large.

Undurti studied at Andhra University, where she received her B.A. in English Literature, History and Politics in 1974, her Master of Art degree in psychology in 1976, and a Ph.D. in psychology in 1985. While working on her Ph.D., Undurti participated in the Human Rights Group at her university and advocated for women threatened by indebted dowries and victims of domestic violence. Undurti was motivated by the work of bell hooks, Phyllis Chesler and Jeanne Marecek, who sparked her interest in feminism. She attended the third Indian Association for Women's Studies Meeting and began researching ways to improve the lives of Indian women.

Undurti joined faculty of the Tata Institute of Social Sciences in 2010. She worked with the Centre for Health and Allied Themes (CEHAT) to create a course on feminist counseling and contributed a chapter on feminist counseling for domestic violence in the 2013 volume Feminist Counseling and Domestic Violence in India. She was the lead researcher of Unpacking Sex Trafficking among women and girls in Andhra Pradesh, sponsored by International Center for Research on Women (ICRW) and Bill & Melinda Gates Foundation.

Undurti's scholarship emphasizes the social injustice women face in Indian society. She focuses on the three research areas: domestic abuse, mental illness, and work-family conflicts that stem from rigid gender roles. In India, many women struggle in living up to societal and familial expectations, where there is often a lack of social support surrounding women's employment. Psychological disorders such as depression, anxiety and somatic symptom disorders are common among women in India and often go undiagnosed and untreated. Moreover, not only are men involved in acts of domestic violence, but also female relatives such as mothers-in-law inflict violence on women in India. Undurti's work calls attention to the power structures that impact women's lives in India with the goal of improving their quality of life.
