= Judith Worell =

American clinical psychologist

- Occupation: Professor of Psychology
- Spouse: Leonard Worell
- Awards: APA Gold Medal Award for Life Achievement in the Practice of Psychology (2010)

Academic background
- Education: PhD, Ohio State University (1954) MA, Ohio State University (1952) BA, Queens College (1950)

Judith Peschya Worell (born 1928) is a licensed clinical psychologist whose work has focused on developing a feminist model for counseling and psychotherapy. She is Professor Emeritus of Psychology at the University of Kentucky.

Worell served as President of the Society for the Psychology of Women, American Psychological Association (APA) Division 35, from 1997 to 1998 and as Editor of Psychology of Women Quarterly.

== Awards ==
Worell received the APA Gold Medal Award for Life Achievement in the Practice of Psychology in 2010. The award citation recognized her as "one of the foremost feminist psychologists in the nation, she is among just a handful of individuals who have been instrumental in establishing and defining an entire field. Feminist psychology owes much of its shape and growth to Judith and her work in research about women and gender roles, in the unique treatment needs of women, and in education in the psychology of women."

Worell received the APA Committee on Women in Psychology Leadership Award in 1990 for "outstanding work and tireless commitment to enhancing the status of women, in society and as professionals, and a long-standing promotion, support and contributions to feminist scholarship." She received the Carolyn Wood Sherif Award in 2001 and the Heritage Award in 2004, both from the Society for the Psychology of Women. Her other awards include the 1991 Distinguished Psychologist Award from the Kentucky Psychological Association.

== Biography ==
Worell was born in 1928 and raised in Greenwich Village. She grew up in a Jewish family with strict gender roles. Her father's actions, specifically the gender rules in their house, are what taught her about sexism and about the division of labor, and it was not something she accepted easily. Later on in her career, Worell said, "Women are the ones delving into advice books because they are 'the caretakers of the relationship'". This idea came from the way she was raised and her mother's relationship with her father. As a child, Worell recalled going to the synagogue with her family, where the women had to sit separately from men because they were "unclean" or "distracting to men". This contrasted with her experience at the progressive elementary school she attended in Greenwich Village, where boys and girls were treated as equals. As a teenager, Worell became involved in the Encampment for Citizenship, a place that trained young adults to be community leaders.

Worell earned her B.A degree in psychology at Queens College, CUNY in New York and graduated in 1950. After marrying Leonard Worell, a fellow student in psychology at Queens College, she and her husband moved to Ohio State University to attend graduate school. At Ohio State, Worell obtained her master's degree in 1952 and her PhD in psychology in 1954, working under the supervision of Julian Rotter. After graduating, Worell followed her husband as he secured faculty positions at different institutions while she was left to find alternative employment. In the late 1950s, Worell secured a position as a research associate at a psychiatric hospital in Iowa, and contributed to research examining whether meprobamate would reduce anxiety in patients.

Eventually Worell and her husband both landed faculty positions at the University of Kentucky. In 1972, Worell joined the Commission on the Status of Women, organized by the Southeastern Psychological Association, where she met many women in psychology who had their Ph.Ds but were unable to get teaching positions due to sexism and patriarchy in academia. As Worell put it, feminism raised women's consciousness about the personal also being political. With women she met, Worell engaged in conversations about sexual violence that made her aware of how common rape was and that women needed a voice. To bring about change, she began her lifework in feminist therapy, integrating tenets of feminism with a cognitive social learning approach to create more effective methods of counseling and psychotherapy that emphasized and supported women's empowerment. Worell put together a feminist counseling and referral service at the Women's Center at the University of Kentucky and went on to establish the first sexual harassment code at the University of Kentucky.

== Books ==
- Johnson, N. G., Roberts, M. C., & Worell, J. E. (1999). Beyond appearance: A new look at adolescent girls. American Psychological Association.
- Worell, J. (Ed.). (2001). Encyclopedia of women and gender, two-volume set: Sex similarities and differences and the impact of society on gender (Vol. 1). Academic Press.
- Worell, J., & Goodheart, C. D. (Eds.). (2005). Handbook of girls' and women's psychological health. Oxford University Press.
- Worell, J. E., & Johnson, N. G. (Eds.) (1997). Shaping the future of feminist psychology: Education, research, and practice. American Psychological Association.
- Worell, J., & Remer, P. (2002). Feminist perspectives in therapy: Empowering diverse women. John Wiley & Sons.
