= Keturah Whitehurst =

African American clinical psychologist

- Born: March 12, 1912
- Died: May 20, 2000 (aged 88)
- Citizenship: United States
- Education: Howard University

Keturah Whitehurst (March 12, 1912 – May 20, 2000) was an African American clinical psychologist who graduated with a PhD in psychology from Radcliffe in 1952. Keturah Whitehurst is regarded as "the mother of Black psychology".

== Early life and education ==
Keturah Whitehurst was born in 1912 in Florida. Her father was a preacher, and her grandfather had escaped enslavement in Alabama. Keturah was an only child. When Keturah was 11 years old, she began to attend a faith-based boarding school in Jacksonville, Florida, because the local school was segregated and said to be inadequate when measuring its merit by the local white school. Keturah graduated from this school at age 16 in 1928 as a valedictorian. Keturah, with her father's guidance, began attending college at Howard University in Washington D.C. at the age of 19 in 1931.

== Higher education and career ==
After three and a half years of undergraduate education, she graduated with her Bachelors of Arts degree in English and Psychology. After her first graduation, Keturah returned home to work and save money to then enter graduate school. During this time, Keturah worked as a vice-principal and a teacher. She was urged to return to graduate school at Howard University by a former professor who gave her a fellowship. While at Howard for graduate studies, it was recommended that she pursue a doctorate degree by Francis Sumner. The entrance into graduate school was paid for by a general education fellowship and allowed Keturah to continue her studies.

She earned her Master of Science degree in experimental psychology at Howard before working for several years and then returning to college. She worked as a professor of sociology, philosophy, and psychology and was also the dean of women at a Florida University.^{,}. After moving states from Florida to Virginia, Whitehurst's reciprocal license was approved by the Commonwealth of Virginia. This meant that Whitehurst was designated as the first African-American clinical psychologist to hold that license in the state. She was also the first African-American woman to be an intern at the Harvard Psychological Clinic. Whitehurst returned to school with a Rockefeller Scholarship that financed her entire doctoral degree. Whitehurst's doctoral dissertation is called Psychological growth as reflected in fantasy.^{,}. Her career was spent working in Virginia, Florida, and Tennessee. Whitehurst's first exit from the educational world occurred in 1977 when she retired in Virginia.

== Legacy and late life ==
Whitehurst opened a school that assisted children with their developmental skills, called The Children's House or Fisk Children's House, which was associated with Fisk University in Nashville, Tennessee.^{,}. A former student assisted in the opening of that school, Florence Farley. Farley was a student and mentee of Whitehurst. Whitehust also applied for grants for her research in child development while at Fisk University in Nashville Tennessee and leadership research at Virginia State College. This resulted in two publications written by Whitehurst from her public health research in 1953 and on student leadership and cultural child development in 1954. Whitehurst instituted the first campus counselling service at Virginia State College, where she worked as the only clinical psychologist faculty. Whitehurst also cared for her mother during her retirement, who lived several years past 100.

During this time, Whitehurst began to study gerontology. After her retirement, Whitehurst returned to college at the age of 73 to obtain an Associate of Arts degree in criminal justice. She participated in community engagement throughout her life. When interviewed at the developmental stage of life integrity versus despair, integrity was analyzed as being fulfilled by Whitehurst in her older years.

A recent experiment by Alvarez et al. (2019) found that Whitehurst's name is not as recognized by modern undergraduate students as her non-minority contemporaries in psychology.
