= Beate West-Leuer =

German psychoanalyst and academic

- Born: 1951 (age 74–75); Dortmund, West Germany
- Education: University of Mainz; Lehigh University; Martin Luther University of Halle-Wittenberg
- Occupations: Psychotherapist, consultant

Beate West-Leuer (born 1951) is a German professor, psychotherapist, consultant and coach.

== Life ==
West-Leuer was born in Dortmund, West Germany. She studied English and American Studies as well as history at the University of Mainz from 1971 to 1976. From 1974 to 1975 she attended Lehigh University in Bethlehem Pennsylvania as part of a German-American exchange program. She also took some elective classes in Philosophy from 1975 to 1977 at the Johns Hopkins University in Baltimore.

From 1977 to 1978 West-Leuer was the Director of Instruction in Atlanta at the Evelyn Wood Reading Dynamics school. She completed training in Gestalt therapy and Depth psychology to become a psychotherapist, as well as receiving accreditation from the German Coaching and Supervision Association (Deutsche Gesellschaft für Supervision und Coaching - DGSv) as a coach. She received accreditation as a Senior Coach from the German Association of Coaching (Deutscher Deutscher Bundesverband Coaching - DBVC) in 2008. She received her doctorate from the Martin Luther University of Halle-Wittenberg in Psychoanalytical Pedagogy and Group dynamics.

West-Leuer was a member of the university council in Germany at Westphalian University (Westfälische Hochschule) from 2012 to 2017 based in Gelsenkirchen, Bocholt and Recklinghausen.

She is currently a lecturer at the Heinrich Heine University Düsseldorf and the International Psychoanalytic University Berlin and has her own consulting practice in Neuss. She is a founding member and Chairwoman of the "Psychodynamic Organizational Development + Personnel Management Düsseldorf" organization, abbreviated locally to POP (Psychodynamische Organisationsentwicklung + Personalmanagement Düsseldorf“). She is a member of the board of the "Academy of Psychoanalysis and Psychodynamics Düsseldorf" (Akademie für Psychoanalyse und Psychodynamik Düsseldorf) in cooperation with the University of Düsseldorf.

As Deputy Chairwoman of the Academy of Psychoanalysis and Psychodynamics Düsseldorf, she sometimes hosts the event "Psychoanalysis and Film" (Psychoanalyse und Film), which takes place monthly at the Black Box arthouse cinema situated in the Düsseldorf Filmmuseum.

West-Leuer is also an editor and co-publisher of the magazine Agora. Düsseldorf Contributions to Psychoanalysis and Society (Agora. Düsseldorfer Beiträge zu Psychoanalyse und Gesellschaft).

She is quoted in the media as an expert on a variety of topics such as an article on the movie The Ten in the Rhine Post (Rheinische Post) newspaper, Initiation Rituals, Confessions and the Devil in US American television series in the public radio service channels WDR 3 and WDR 5.

She also supports film projects of young directors, such as the creation of the film Tomo by Florian Heinzen-Ziob about a humanoid robot.

== Research ==
West-Leuer's research concentrates on the topic of psychoanalysis and its applications. Her main focus is on qualitative projects for researching leadership styles and psychodynamic counselling in contrast to other counselling concepts and therapies. She is also active in documentary research within the scope of film analysis using modern day films as objectivations to understand the psyche of their authors and as testimonies and sources which explain human behaviour.

West-Leuer speaks regularly in German and English on a variety of psychoanalytical topics. She has presented her scientifically based concept of psychodynamic counseling internationally.

== Publications ==
- With Claudia Sies: "Coaching - A Course Book for Psychodynamic Consultation" (Coaching – Ein Kursbuch für die Psychodynamische Beratung). Pfeiffer bei Klett-Cotta, Stuttgart, 2003, ISBN 978-3-608-89725-8
- "Coaching in Schools" (Coaching an Schulen). Psychosozial-Verlag, Gießen, 2007, ISBN 978-3-89806-576-4.
- Interaktive Beratung und Schulentwicklung. Eine Untersuchung zum Ist-Zustand. VDM-Verlag, Saarbrücken, 2008, ISBN 978-3836468442
- With Matthias Franz (Pub.): "Bonding - Trauma - Prevention. Development Opportunities for Children and Youths as a Result of their Experiences in Relationships" (Bindung – Trauma – Prävention. Entwicklungschancen von Kindern und Jugendlichen als Folge ihrer Beziehungserfahrungen). Psychosozial-Verlag, Gießen, 2008, ISBN 978-3-8980-6768-3
- With Eva-Marie Lewkowicz (Pub.): "Leadership and Feelings. Achieving Authenticity and Leadership Success with Emotions"(Führung und Gefühl. Mit Emotionen zu Authentizität und Führungserfolg). Springer, Berlin, 2016, ISBN 978-3-662-48920-8
- West-Leuer, B.: "Interactive Coaching and School Development. An investigation of the Current State" (Interaktive Beratung und Schulentwicklung. Eine Untersuchung zum Ist-Zustand). Saarbrücken, 2008: VDM- Verlag.
- With Marga Löwer-Hirsch: "Psychodynamic Coaching for Executives. Individual and Group Coaching in Theory and Practice" (Psychodynamisches Coaching für Führungskräfte. Einzel- und Gruppencoachings in Theorie und Praxis). Wiesbaden: Springer, Wiesbaden, 2017, ISBN 978-3-658-14856-0
