= Pauline Sears =

American educational psychologist

Pauline Sears (1908-1993) was an American educational psychologist.
