= Sandra Schwartz Tangri =

Feminist psychologist

- Occupation: Professor of Social Psychology
- Awards: APA Carolyn Wood Sherif Award

Academic background
- Education: University of Michigan (Ph.D. Social Psychology)
- Thesis: Role-innovation in occupational choice among college women

Academic work
- Institutions: Howard University

Sandra Florence Schwartz Tangri (August 27, 1936 – June 11, 2003) was a feminist psychologist and distinguished university professor of social psychology and the psychology of women. Tangri conducted pioneering research on the lives of women who graduated from college and embarked on careers dominated by men. She studied women's motivations in choosing a career and their experiences of sexual harassment.

Tangri is known for conducting the Women's Life Paths Study, a longitudinal study extending over a period of 25 years that examined the life paths and experiences of the female graduates of the University of Michigan Class of 1967. Besides her scholarly work, Tangri was a political and social activist involved in the gender equality movement in the 1990s.

== Biography ==
Sandra Schwartz was born in St. Louis and raised in Los Angeles in a working-class Jewish immigrant family. Her father, Haim Schwartz, was a Yiddish published poet from a town in Belarus. Tangri credited her feminist identity, and the basis for her politics to her father's strong devotion to social justice and her experience growing up in a working-class Jewish family.

Tangri attended Los Angeles City College and Reed College. She went on to receive a B.A. in psychology with honors from the University of California, Berkeley. She furthered her education by receiving a M.A in psychology at Wayne State University in 1964, and a Ph.D. in Social Psychology at the University of Michigan in 1969. Her dissertation title "Role-innovation in occupational choice among college women" was a longitudinal study involving 200 women from the University of Michigan Class of 1967.

Tangri taught at Douglass College, Rutgers University, and at Richmond College which later merged to form the College of Staten Island. Tangri left academia in 1974 to become Director of the Office of Research at the United States Commission of Civil Rights, where she remained for five years. Tangri was a senior research associate at the Urban Institute from 1982 to 1985. From 1980 until her retirement in 1998, Tangri was a professor of social psychology at Howard University. At Howard University, Tangri's research focused on the educational and work experiences of educated African American women. Tangri's research was funded by the National Institute of Mental Health, the MacArthur Foundation, the National Institute of Education, and the Labor Department.

Tangri was a Fulbright fellow to New Zealand in 1991. She was an elected Fellow of the American Psychological Association and served on the Council of the Society for the Psychology of Women.

Tangri's marriage to Shanti Tangri ended in divorce. Tangri died on June 11, 2003, in Bethesda, Maryland from lung cancer.

== Awards ==
Tangri received the Carolyn Wood Sherif Award for contributions to the Psychology of Women and Gender from Division 35 of the American Psychological Association (Society for the Psychology of Women) in 1999.

Tangri received the Distinguished Publication Award from the Association for Women in Psychology for her 1976 article "A feminist perspective on ethical issues in population programs".

APA Division 35 (Society for the Psychology of Women) previously awarded the Sandra Schwartz Tangri Memorial Award for Graduate Student Research focusing on issues such as "sexual harassment, discrimination, reproductive rights, concerns of ethnic and sexual minority women and the mentoring of first-generation college students."

== Books ==
- Mednick, Martha T.S., Sandra S. Tangri, & Lois W. Hoffman, (Eds.) (1975). Women and achievement: Social and motivational analysis. Hemisphere Publishing Corporation.

== Representative publications ==
- Mednick, Martha Shuch; Tangri, Sandra Schwartz (1972). "New Social Psychological Perspectives on Women". Journal of Social Issues. 28 (2): 1–16.
- Schwartz, Michael; Tangri, Sandra Schwartz (1965). "A Note on Self-Concept as an Insulator Against Delinquency". American Sociological Review. 30 (6): 922–926.
- Tangri, Sandra Schwartz (1972). "Determinants of Occupational Role Innovation Among College Women". Journal of Social Issues. 28 (2): 177–199.
- Tangri, Sandra Schwartz (1976). "A Feminist Perspective on Some Ethical Issues in Population Programs". Signs. 1: 895–904.
- Tangri, Sandra Schwartz (2001). "Some Life Lessons". Psychology of Women Quarterly. 23: 98–102.
- Tangri, Sandra Schwartz; Burt, Martha R.; Johnson, Leanor B. (1982). "Sexual Harassment at Work: Three Explanatory Models". Journal of Social Issues. 38 (4): 33–54.
