= Margaret Ives =

American psychologist

Margaret Ives (10 April 1903 – 15 July 2000) was an American psychologist most known for her work in education, forensic psychology, and her clinical work at St. Elizabeths Hospital in Washington D.C. Over the course of her career, Ives received the diploma of the American Board of Professional Psychology (ABPP) in 1948, served as the president of the Division of Consulting Psychology of the American Psychological Association (APA), and later as the president of the Washington D.C. Psychological Association in 1975. The U.S. Department of Health, Education, and Welfare recognized her contributions with the Superior Service Award in 1964. In 1974, she was awarded the Harold M. Hildreth Memorial Award for psychologists in public service, and her pioneering efforts in forensic psychology were recognized by the American Board of Forensic Psychology in 1980.

== Early life and education ==
Ives was born on April 10, 1903, in Detroit, Michigan to Augustus Wright Ives and Julia Clair Chandler. She was the eldest of two children and she enjoyed a close relationship with her brother, Chandler Ives, who died at the age of fifteen. A freshman in college at the time of her brother's death, Ives dedicated herself to her studies. Ives's father, a psychiatrist and a professor at the Detroit College of Medicine, was supportive of her interest in psychology and her mother registered her for early admission to Vassar College.

While attending Vassar, Ives studied psychology under the president of the American Psychological Association at the time, Margaret Floy Washburn. Ives later published “Memory Revival of Emotions as a Test of Emotional and Phlegmatic Temperaments,” in which she examined the connections between emotions and remembered situations. This article was published in the American Journal of Psychology in 1925.

== Career ==
After graduating from Vassar, Ives was offered a position at a continuation school in Elizabeth, New Jersey, teaching students who had dropped out of high school and who were working in factories. She later recalled the valuable experience she gained from working with these students and pursuing nontraditional approaches to their education, such as experiences outside of the classroom. During this time, Margaret Wittemore, the vice president of the Women's Party, invited Ives to Washington, D.C. to protest in favor of the Equal Rights Amendment. She briefly met with President Calvin Coolidge during this trip. Ives decided to leave New Jersey after a change in her school's administration. She began her graduate studies at Michigan State University in 1928.

After completing her master's degree, Ives was offered in 1929 a position at the Wayne County Clinic for Child Study, which worked with the juvenile court system in Detroit. While in this position, Ives conducted interviews and assessments of dependent and delinquent children and wrote reports for and often appeared in court proceedings.

Just two months after taking the Wayne County Court position, the stock market crashed, setting off the Great Depression. To supplement her small salary, Ives applied for a fellowship from Vassar and returned to graduate school at the University of Michigan. While attending, Ives considered applying for the University Fellowship at Michigan, but was told she had no chance of being chosen because she was a woman. She applied anyway and was awarded the fellowship.

While working on her dissertation, Ives accepted a position at the Henry Ford Hospital in Detroit. She continued her dissertation research for the next three years while also working at the Ford Hospital. Ives received her Ph.D. in June 1938.

Ives continued working at the Ford Hospital with patients of varying needs, including infants being placed for adoption due to "psychotics." She decided to seek other employment after the lay superintendent said that women should not be paid as much as men. Ives only received 60% of the salary of her male colleagues after she received her Ph.D.

In 1943, Ives accepted a position at St. Elizabeths Hospital in Washington, D.C. She went on to become the chief psychologist at St Elizabeths. Later, Ives became the Director of Psychological Services and Associate Director for Psychology. It was at Saint Elizabeths Hospital that Ives engaged in some of her most significant work. As part of her duties, she taught psychology to the nursing staff, conducted psychotherapy, and was called as a witness in federal court. The two most consequential cases she participated in were Durham v. United States (1954) and Jenkins v. United States (1962). Monte Durham was a client of Ives and she testified in his trial, the result of which gave name to the Durham Rule, which found that a defendant could be found not guilty due to "mental disease or defect." The decision in Jenkins v. United States was also significant because it held that a psychologist's professional opinions "as an expert witness concerning the nature, and existence or non-existence, of mental disease and defect."

During her career at St. Elizabeths, Ives also taught a psychology class at George Washington University from 1946 to 1970.

== Retirement and death ==
Ives retired from St. Elizabeths in 1973, but maintained a small private practice for a time. The Board of Trustees of the American Psychological Association offered her a part-time position as an executive officer, which led her to be actively involved in debates concerning the different specializations in psychology and a definition of “psychologist.” Ives also was a member of the District of Columbia Board Psychologist Examiners (1971-1977), served on the advising committee of the District of Columbia Mental Health Association (1977-1985), and on the advising committee for the District of Columbia State Mental Health Plan (1980-1984).

Ives lived in Alexandria, Virginia prior to her death, but suffered from dementia in her final years. She died at Hospice of Northern Virginia on July 15, 2000. She was 97.
