= Hayes, Illinois =

- Unincorporated community
- Location within Illinois Location within the United States
- Coordinates: 39°51′45″N 88°16′52″W
- Country: United States
- State: Illinois
- County: Douglas
- Elevation: 692 ft (211 m)
- Time zone: UTC-6 (Central (CST))
  - Summer (DST): UTC-5 (CDT)
- Area code: 217
- GNIS feature ID: 422791

Hayes is an unincorporated community in Douglas County, Illinois, United States. Hayes is 3.5 miles (5.6 km) south of Pesotum.

== History ==
Hayes was founded in 1877. The community was named for Samuel Jarvis Hayes, a railroad official.
