= McAdoo (surname) =

McAdoo is a surname. Notable people with the surname include:

- Ben McAdoo (born 1977), American football coach
- Benjamin F. McAdoo (1920–1981), American architect
- Bob McAdoo (born 1951), American basketball player
- Charles McAdoo (born 2002), American baseball player
- Derrick McAdoo (born 1965), American football player
- Eleanor Wilson McAdoo (1889–1967), daughter of Woodrow Wilson and second wife of William Gibbs McAdoo
- Harriette Pipes McAdoo (1940–2009), American sociologist and professor
- Henry McAdoo (1916–1998), Irish bishop
- James Michael McAdoo (born 1993), American basketball player
- John David McAdoo (1824–1883), Confederate general
- Mike McAdoo (born 1990), American football player
- Orpheus McAdoo (1858–1900), African-American singer and minstrel show impresario
- Stephen McAdoo (born 1970), American football player and coach
- Tullie McAdoo (1884–1961), American Negro league baseball player
- Violet McAdoo (1900–1961), Irish artist
- William McAdoo (New Jersey politician), (1853–1930)
- William Gibbs McAdoo (1863–1941), American Democratic politician and Secretary of the Treasury in World War I
