= Georgia Babladelis =

American psychologist and academic

- Born: January 30, 1931 (age 95)
- Died: May 28, 2009 (aged 78)
- Education: University of Michigan; University of California, Berkeley; University of Colorado Boulder
- Scientific career
- Fields: Psychology

Georgia Babladelis (January 30, 1931 – May 28, 2009) was an American psychologist, born to Greek immigrant parents in Manistique, Michigan. Starting in the 1950s, Babladelis' work focused on creating diversity in universities and ensuring that women had a place in the workforce as well as in school environments. Babladelis studied gender and sex roles; personality development; psychotherapy; the psychology of women; and women's education. Babladelis played a major role in Division 35: Society for the Psychology of Women, which formed as a special interest group for the American Psychological Association in 1973.

== Early life and education ==
Babladelis had a sister, Helen, and two brothers, George and Nicholas. She remained in Michigan for much of her youth and graduated from Manistique High School. She earned a Bachelor of Arts in Psychology from the University of Michigan in 1953. She earned her Master of Arts from the University of California, Berkeley in 1957. In 1960, she was awarded a Ph.D. in Psychology from the University of Colorado Boulder.

== Career in psychology ==
After working at the Alameda County Juvenile Justice Center in Oakland in the early 1960s, Babladelis accepted a position as a psychology professor at California State University in 1963. She held this position until 1994. As one of the university's first female professors, Babladelis contributed to the development of Cal State's women's studies program by initiating a course to study the psychology of women there. She also started the university's nursing department. Her research explored the achievements and experiences of returning students, who were predominantly women, which influenced her commitment to gender related topics. She was also the founding editor of Psychology of Women Quarterly, a research journal dedicated to female cognition and behavior.

After she retired from teaching in 1994, Babladelis continued writing and she worked closely with the League of Women Voters. Through this work, she was able to continue promoting and supporting feminism. Babladelis also created a scholarship, named after her, to support students who return to school to complete their degrees. "This university has always been very supportive of the mature students making their way back", Babladelis said in 2005. "I’ve seen how these students, in particular, can have a more difficult time succeeding in the classroom. They’re already holding down full-time jobs while supporting their families. I’ve had first-hand contact with so many of these students, and I’ve come to admire the challenge they take on."

== Psychology of Women Quarterly ==
Babladelis founded Psychology of Women Quarterly, a research journal dedicated to female behavior and cognition. Babladelis about the importance of studying not only women but also expanding the focus of psychology to populations outside the college student demographic.

== Professional accolades ==
In 1992, Babladelis was recognized as one of the "100 Outstanding Women in Psychology" during the American Psychological Association's centennial celebration. She will also be remembered as one of the founders and editors of the Psychology of Women Quarterly and the work published in the journal over the years.

== Personal life ==
Babladelis had a passion for animals. This led her to research gorilla interaction and communication. In this research, she found that gorillas have the desire to be in family settings.

== International travel and continued activism ==
Babladelis enjoyed international travel, a passion she combined with her work promoting women's rights. She was interested in many different cultures. She served as the U.S. Director of Research for the UNESCO in the early 1980s. In this role, she combined her professional interest in promoting women's rights with her ability to learn about other countries and cultures.
