= Gertrud Meili-Dworetzki =

Swiss psychologist (1912–1995)

Gertrud Meili-Dworetzki (1912 in Danzig-9 April 1995 in Bern) was a Swiss psychologist.

== Life ==
She attended lectures from Horkheimer and Adorno, Mannheim and Tillich for one year. After 1933 she studied psychology in Bern and Geneva. Meili-Dworetzki promoted and dealt with the connection between psychology and philosophy in numerous specialist articles and books. After her husband, Richard Meili, with whom she had two sons, had been appointed to the Chair of Psychology at the University of Bern in 1949, she became his co-worker. She also translated from English and French.

== Works ==
- Johanna Schopenhauer, Verlag Droste, 1987, ISBN 3770007425
- Spielarten des Menschenbildes: ein Vergleich der Menschenzeichnungen japanischer und schweizerischer Kinder, Verlag Huber, 1982, ISBN 3456810970
- Das Bild des Menschen in der Vorstellung und Darstellung des Kleinkindes, Verlag Huber, 1957
- Lust und Angst: Regulative Momente in der Persönlichkeitsentwicklung zweier Brüder, Verlag Huber, 1959
- Heimatort Freie Stadt Danzig, Verlag Droste, 1985, ISBN 3770006836

Translations

- Sigmund Freud, Leben und Werk: Die letzte Phase : 1919 - 1939, Ernest Jones, Dt. Taschenbuch-Verlag, 1984
- Jahre der Reife, 1901-1919, Band 2 von Das Leben und Werk von Sigmund Freud, Autoren Ernest Jones, Katherine Jones, Verlag Huber, 1982, ISBN 3456811942
