= Theodate Louise Smith =

American psychologist (1859–1914)

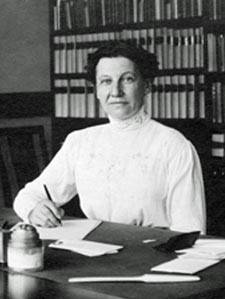
- Born: April 9, 1859; Hallowell, Maine
- Died: February 16, 1914 (aged 54); Worcester, Massachusetts
- Education: Smith College, Yale University
- Occupations: psychologist, researcher, educator

Theodate Louise Smith (1859–1914) was an American psychologist known for her research on early childhood and the Montessori method of education.

Smith was born in Hallowell, Maine on April 9, 1859. She attended Smith College, receiving her master's degree in 1884. She earned her PhD from Yale University in 1896. One of the first women to attended Yale, she studied under Edward Wheeler Scripture. After receiving her degree from Yale she worked as a research assistant for the psychologist G. Stanley Hall at Clark University from 1902 through 1909. She went on to serve as a lecturer and librarian for the now-defunct Children’s Institute at Clark until her death in 1914.

Smith wrote The Montessori system in theory and practice : an introduction to the pedagogic methods of Dr. Maria Montessori which was published in 1912.

Smith died suddenly in Worcester, Massachusetts on February 16, 1914, having fallen ill due to diabetes.
