= Harriet Babcock =

American psychologist

- Born: 1877; Westerly, Rhode Island
- Died: 12 December 1952 (aged 74–75)
- Education: Columbia University
- Scientific career
- Fields: Abnormal psychology
- Workplaces: New York University
- Thesis: An experiment in the measurement of mental deterioration (1930)

Harriet Babcock (1877–1952) was an American psychologist who specialized in abnormal psychology research in addition to developing measures and theories of intelligence. After her doctoral work at Columbia University, she worked primarily in the Department of Psychology at New York University, and acted as a consultant to the New York City Guidance Bureau. Babcock developed multiple intelligence tests evaluating mental deterioration and efficiency.

== Education and career ==
Babcock was educated at Columbia University and received her doctoral degree in 1930. During her education from 1923 to 1925, she also worked at the Manhattan State Hospital as a psychologist, and later as chief psychologist at Bellevue Hospital from 1926 to 1928.

Babcock began working at New York University's Department of Psychology in 1931 and continued to work there for her entire career. In addition, she was employed as a consultant with the Guidance Bureau under the New York Board of Education.

== Research ==
Some of Babcock's early work focused on schizophrenia in relation to problem solving behavior. Babcock argued that schizophrenia was most accurately characterized as a slowness in intellectual speed. This characterizations was in contrast to other theories of schizophrenia in terms of split attention, or a failure to generate abstract ideas.

Another arm of Babcock's work focused on concerns surrounding the Stanford-Binet test. Specifically, scores between children discretely grouped based on intelligence failed to reveal any substantial differences. Furthermore, when the test was administered to patients with mental illness, scores on the vocabulary portion of the test were less affected compared to other subtests. This finding prompted Babcock to further investigate this finding in order to better understand intelligence deficiencies as a result of mental illness. The result of this investigation led to the design of the Babcock Deterioration Test, developed on the hypothesis that compared to newer associations in memory, older ones 1) are more accessible after they are retrieved, and 2) and becomes inaccessible more slowly over time.

=== Babcock Test of Mental Deterioration ===
The Babcock Test of Mental Deterioration was developed to provide an estimate of a patient's premorbid intelligence by way of evaluating vocabulary. The basis for the test rested on the hypothesis that because the "oldest learned habits are the last to be forgotten" in cases of dementia, vocabulary should be relatively less affected by mental illness compared to more recently learned associations. However, some researchers commented that the premorbid measure may not be a valid measure of intelligence. For instance, vocabulary might suffer as a result of the patient's disorder; it may also be the case that patients may have difficulty with vocabulary in their premorbid condition. Other researchers noted its usefulness as an indicator in the context of other intelligence measures.
