= Star Vega (psychologist) =

American psychologist

Star Vega (1948–2004) was a Mexican American psychologist who specialized in child and multicultural psychology.

== Personal life ==
Vega was born in Parras Coahu, Mexico on May 30, 1948, and died in La Crescenta, California, on April 24, 2004.

=== Family ===
Star Vega had one son, Jeffrey Bryan Wiltse, who was born on February 11, 1968, and died on September 24, 1989, in California. Her mother Blanca Vega Harvey, sister Reyna Vega Nash, brother Al Vega, and grandmother Pilar Vega are all honored in her 1983 dissertation.

=== Death ===
Star Vega died on April 24, 2004, in La Crescenta, Los Angeles County, California at the age of 55. Vega battled leukemia for more than three years and underwent a bone marrow transplant that left her autoimmune system weak, she later died in result of it.

== Education ==
Vega attended the University of Southern California where she received her doctorate degree in clinical psychology, making her only the fifth bilingual/multicultural person to receive a doctorate degree in clinical psychology at this institution. During Vega's years as a graduate student, she wrote one of the earliest dissertations regarding the effects of culture on psychological assessment in 1984 titled, The Cultural Effects Upon MMPI Responses of Industrially-Injured Mexican and Anglo-American Males. Vega stated that Mexican-Americans who scored high on the MMPI were liable for malingering because of cultural differences. These differences were not factored in the MMPI, causing the outcomes of worker's compensation to be faulty. In addition to this dissertation, she also wrote "Translating Research Into Action: Reducing Disparities in Mental Health Care for Mexican Americans" in 2002. This piece led to government allocations of increased mental health care rights in Fresno, California for Mexican Americans.

== Career ==
Following the completion of her education, Vega opened her own private practice that centered around child and multicultural psychology. At this point in her career, Vega was mastered in forensic psychology, neuropsychology, child psychology, multicultural psychology, pharmacology, and industrial medicine.

=== Teaching ===
Later in her professional career, Vega began professing at Phillips Graduate Institute (now Phillips Graduate University).

=== Later work ===
In 2002, Vega served as the President of the California Psychological Association (CPA), the first Latina woman to ever do so, and would later receive various awards from both the CPA and the American Psychological Association (APA). Later in 2002, Vega received the Karl F. Heiser award for Advocacy in regard to her work in the psychology community and her continued dedication to “define the discipline of psychology statutorily by state and federal laws."

=== Mental health and Latina women working ===
The quality of mental health in the Latin community is a topic that causes concern with one in five community members suffering from at least one mental illness. More specifically, many Latina women who are pursuing their careers, in the same way Vega did, are often at higher risks for the development of a mental illness. For example, depression is twice as likely to appear in Latina women than it is Latino men and working Latina women have reported much higher rates of stress than unemployed Latina women. One factor that could be contributing to this high rate of depression and stress in Latina women could be the due to Latina women often being overqualified for the job positions they are working as a result of both gender and racial discrimination.

== List of honors and achievements ==
- First Latina president of CPA (2002)
- Karl F. Heiser Award for Advocacy (2002)
- Distinguished Contribution to Psychology as a Profession Award
- Heiser Presidential Award for Advocacy

The National Latinx Psychological Association's "Star Vega Distinguished Service Award" is named after Vega.
