= Sue Rosenberg Zalk =

American psychologist

- Citizenship: United States
- Occupation: Professor of Psychology

Academic background
- Education: New York University; Yeshiva University

Academic work
- Institutions: Hunter College; CUNY Graduate School

Sue Rosenberg Zalk (1945 – 2001) was a development psychologist, feminist, and psychoanalyst known for her work on interpersonal relationships and attitudes about race and gender. Zalk was the Vice President for Student Affairs at the CUNY Graduate School at the time of her death.

== Biography ==
Sue Rosenberg Zalk was born on May 28, 1945, in New York. Her parents were Cecilia and Samuel Rosenberg. She attended New York University and received her B.A. degree in psychology in 1967. After graduating, she became an elementary school teacher. She continued with her studies at Ferkauf Graduate School of Yeshiva University where she received her M.A. degree in 1970 and her doctorate in Educational Psychology in 1972. She obtained training in psychoanalysis at the New York Center for Psychoanalytic Training.

Zalk taught at Hunter College (1974-1979) and the CUNY Graduate Center (1979-2001). She was Editor-in-Chief of the journal Sex Roles from 1991 to 2001. Zalk served as a member of the Council of the Society for the Psychological Study of Social Issues, American Psychological Association [APA] Division 9, and was active in the Society for the Psychology of Women (APA, Division 35). The Society for the Psychology of Women created the Sue Rosenberg Zalk Award for Distinguished Service to the Society for the Psychology of Women as a memorial in her honor.

Other awards in her honor include the Sue Rosenberg Zalk Endowed Fund Award, given by the CUNY Graduate Center to assist the scholarly research of a graduate student in the Women's Studies Certificate Program and the Sue Rosenberg Zalk Award given to a member of the CUNY community by the Feminist Press.

Zalk studied various topics in developmental psychology and the psychology of gender, including sex roles, violence against women, sexual harassment, and multiple role stress. With Phyllis A. Katz, Zalk created the Katz-Zalk Projective Prejudice Test to assess racial attitudes in children. Outside of her scholarly work, she was a mentor who inspired and influenced the lives of her students. She served as the first ombudsman officer at CUNY (1992-1995).

She married Richard Zalk in 1971. They separated in 1991 but did not divorce. She died unexpectedly of a brain aneurysm on July 11, 2001, in Florida.

== Books ==
- Zalk, S. R., & Gordon-Kelter, J. (1992). Revolutions in knowledge: Feminism in the social sciences. Routledge.
- Zalk, S. R., & Franzini, L. R., (1997). Convention survival techniques: Getting the most out of your professional association meetings. Sage.

== Representative publications ==
- Katz, P. A., Sohn, M., & Zalk, S. R. (1975). Perceptual concommitants of racial attitudes in urban grade-school children. Developmental Psychology, 11(2), 135–144.
- Katz, P. A., & Zalk, S. R. (1978). Modification of children's racial attitudes. Developmental Psychology, 14(5), 447–461.
- Seavey, C. A., Katz, P. A., & Zalk, S. R. (1975). Baby x. Sex Roles, 1(2), 103–109.
- Zalk, S. R., & Katz, P. A. (1978). Gender attitudes in children. Sex Roles, 4(3), 349–357.
- Zalk, S. R. (1990). Men in the academy: A psychological profile of harassment. In M. A. Paludi (Ed.), Ivory power: Sexual harassment on campus (pp. 141–175). State University of New York Press.
