= Marion Bills =

American psychologist

Marion Almira Bills (1890–1970) was an American psychologist who made early contributions to industrial and organizational psychology. Bills taught at several universities, but she was better known for her work applying personnel psychology at Aetna, where she was the first female officer hired by the company.

== Career ==
Bills earned a Ph.D. at Bryn Mawr College, where she studied under Clarence Ferree, a protégé of Edward B. Titchener who studied visual processes. Bills may have found encouragement in the fact that there were several women on the faculty at Bryn Mawr, including Gertrude Rand.

After leaving Bryn Mawr, Bills became a research assistant to psychologist Walter V. Bingham at the Bureau of Personnel Research at the Carnegie Institute of Technology, and she was later named associate director of the center. In 1924–25, Bills conducted research studies at the Life Insurance Research Bureau.

In 1926, Aetna hired Bills as its first female officer. She made significant changes to personnel policies, and she implemented a piece work bonus pay system for data processing personnel. She became known for her efforts to bridge science and industry, applying psychological research to the selection of clerical and sales employees.

Bills was involved in the founding of Division 14 of the American Psychological Association; the division later became the Society for Industrial and Organizational Psychology (SIOP). She was named president of the organization in 1951. She never married. She retired in 1955 and died in 1970. In 2013, her estate gifted $2.3 million to the University of Hartford for student financial assistance.
