= Solomon Machover =

American psychologist

- Born: May 23, 1906
- Died: July 1, 1976 (aged 70)
- Occupation: psychologist
- Employer: Kings County Hospital Center
- Organization: Psychologists League
- Spouse: Karen Alper (m. 1936)
- Children: 1 son
- Honours: Fellow of the Society for Projective Techniques and Rorschach Institute, Inc.

Solomon Machover (May 23, 1906 – July 1, 1976) was an American psychologist.

== Career ==
As a young clinician at Bellevue Hospital, Machover collaborated with a small group of activists there (including his future wife Karen Alper) to found the Psychologists League. He was a member of the Communist Party caucus at Bellevue and became the first Chairman of the League. It was a Popular Front group with liberal, socialist and communist members that agitated for jobs and better treatment for psychologists Machover became a full professor at SUNY Downstate Medical Center in 1961. In 1971, Machover was the chief psychologist at Kings County Hospital Center.

== Awards and honors ==
In 1948, Machover became a Fellow of the Society for Projective Techniques and Rorschach Institute, Inc.

== Personal life ==
In 1936, Machover married psychologist Karen Alper from Minsk, Belarus. They had a son, Robert Machover.
