= Joan Scott Wallace =

First African American administrator for the U.S. Department of Agriculture

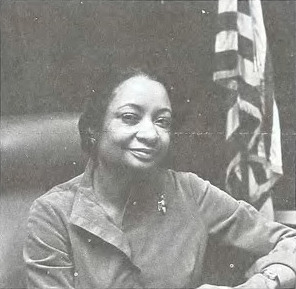
- Born: 8 November 1930; Chicago, Illinois
- Died: 15 March 2018 (aged 87); Matteson, Illinois
- Education: Bradley University, Columbia University, & Northwestern University
- Occupations: Academic Administrator and Psychologist
- Known for: First African American administrator for the U.S. Department of Agriculture

Joan Scott Wallace (8 November 1930 - 15 March 2018) was the first Black female leader of the United States Department of Agriculture, serving as Assistant Secretary. Wallace also served as a diplomat, and outside of government service was a psychologist and educator.

== Early life and education ==
Joan Edaire Scott Wallace was born in Chicago to painter and muralist William Edouard Scott and social worker Esther Fulks Scott on November 8, 1930. Wallace graduated from Englewood High School as the first Black salutatorian in 1948. She completed a bachelor's degree in sociology at Bradley University in 1952, a master's in social work from Columbia University in 1954, and a doctorate from Northwestern University in experimental social psychology. Wallace also attended the Harvard Institute for Educational Management in Boston, MA.

In 1954, Wallace married John H. Wallace with whom she had three sons, Eric, Victor, and Marc. They later divorced and Wallace married pastor and activist Maurice Dawkins in 1979. The two remained married until Dawkins' death in 2001 and in 2003, Wallace remarried her first husband.

== Career ==
From 1967 to 1973, Wallace was the associate professor of Psychology and Social Work and Director of Undergraduate School of Social Work and Department of Psychology at the University of Illinois, Chicago. In 1970, while on leave from the University of Illinois, Chicago, Wallace served as Director of Afro American Studies and associate professor of Sociology and Psychology at Barat College. Then, in 1973 Wallace was named Dean of Howard University's School of Social Work. Between 1975 and 1976, she served at the National Urban League as Deputy Executive Director for Programs. The following year, Wallace was named Vice President of Administration at Morgan State University and then became Director of the Western Michigan University School of Social Work.

In 1977, Wallace was appointed Assistant Secretary for Administration in the Department of Agriculture by President Jimmy Carter, the third woman and the first African American to hold the position. She was in the position until 1981, when she became head of the International Cooperation and Development Agency (ICDA). At ICDA, Wallace sent specialists to provide technical assistance in agriculture to 100 foreign countries and managed over 500 research programs. In 1989, President George H. W. Bush appointed her to the Inter-American Institute for Co-operation on Agriculture (IICA) Diplomatic Representative in the Republic of Trinidad and Tobago; she held the position until 1993. Wallace retired from Government service in 1995 and became the chairman of Americans for Democracy in Africa, an organization that monitors elections. In 1999, Wallace joined the faculty of Florida International University as Professor and associate director of the School of Social Work. The following year, she served as Commissioner of Volunteer Florida.

Joan Scott Wallace has been awarded honorary degrees from the University of Maryland, Eastern Shore, Bowie State College, and Alabama A&M University.
