= Feminist therapy =

Set of related therapies

Feminist therapy is a set of related therapies arising from what proponents see as a disparity between the origin of most psychological theories and the majority of people seeking counseling being female. It focuses on societal, cultural, and political causes and solutions to issues faced in the counseling process. It openly encourages the client to participate in the world in a more social and political way.

Feminist therapy contends that women are in a disadvantaged position in the world due to sex, gender, sexuality, race, ethnicity, religion, age and other categories. Feminist therapists argue that many problems that arise in therapy are due to disempowering social forces; thus the goal of therapy is to recognize these forces and empower the client. In a feminist therapy setting the therapist and client work as equals. The therapist must demystify therapy from the beginning to show the client that she is her own rescuer, and the expectations, roles, and responsibilities of both client and therapist must be explored and equally agreed upon. The therapist recognizes that with every symptom a client has, there is a strength.

Feminist therapy grew out of concerns that established therapies were not helping women. Specific concerns of feminist therapists included gender bias and stereotyping in therapy; blaming victims of physical abuse and sexual abuse; and the assumption of a traditional nuclear family.

== Principles ==
1. An egalitarian relationship (a relationship in which the participants have equal status) between therapist and client is key in feminist therapy, utilizing the therapist's psychological knowledge and the client's knowledge of herself. The inherent power differentials between therapist and client are addressed, and the client must realize that the therapist is not giving her power, but power comes from within herself. This relationship provides a model for women to take responsibility in making all of their relationships egalitarian. Feminist therapists focus on embracing the client's strengths rather than fixing their weaknesses, and accept and validate the client's feelings.
2. Feminist therapy theory is always being revised and added to as social contexts change and the discourse develops.
3. The therapist always retains accountability.
4. The feminist therapy model is non-victim blaming.
5. The client's well-being is the leading principle in all aspects of therapy.

== Feminist therapists' responsibilities ==
1. Feminist therapists must integrate feminist analysis in all spheres of their work.
2. Feminist therapists must recognize the client's socioeconomic and political circumstances, especially with issues in access to mental health care.
3. Feminist therapists must be actively involved in ending oppression, empowering women and girls, respecting differences, and social change.
4. Feminist therapists must be aware of their own situated experience (their own socioeconomic and political situations as well as sex, gender, race, sexuality, etc.) and is constantly self-evaluating and remedying their own biases and oppressive actions. As well as must be learning about other dominant and non-dominant cultural and ethnic experiences.
5. Feminist therapists must accept and validate their client's experiences and feelings.

== Contributors ==
- Jamie Kohanyi
- Judith Worell
- Pam Remer
- Sandra Bem
- Laura Brown
- Jean Baker Miller
- Carolyn Enns
- Ellyn Kaschak
- Bonnie Burstow
- Judith V. Jordan
- Mary N. Russell

== Criticism ==
In 1977, scholar Susan Thomas argued that feminist therapy was "more [a] part of a social movement than [a] type of psychotherapy", and was so intimately tied to broader social and political feminism that its legitimacy as a therapeutic school was questionable.

Psychiatrist Sally Satel of Yale University has been critical of feminist therapy since the late 1990s, characterizing it as promoting a paranoid conspiracy. Satel argued in her 2000 book P.C. MD: How Political Correctness Is Corrupting Medicine that the very concept of feminist therapy is contrary to the methods and goals of psychotherapy, sometimes so far as to veer into potential malpractice. Traditionally, notes Satel, the goal of therapy is to help the patient understand and alter unrealistic thinking and unhealthy behaviors to improve the patient's confidence, interpersonal skills, and quality of life. Traditional therapy, while rooted in well-tested methods, must also be flexible enough to adapt to each patient's unique experiences, personality and needs.

== See also ==
- Trauma-informed feminist therapy
