= Lucia Albino Gilbert =

American psychologist

- Occupation: Professor Emerita of Psychology
- Spouse: John C. Gilbert

Academic background
- Education: Wells College, Yale University, University of Texas at Austin

Lucia Albino Gilbert is a psychologist known for her research on gender equality and feminist psychology, with a specific focus on women's career development and families with dual careers. She is professor emerita of Educational Psychology at The University of Texas at Austin and professor emerita of Psychology at Santa Clara University.

Gilbert has been honored with awards for teaching, mentorship, and research excellence. Gilbert received the Leona Tyler Award in 2012, and presented her award address on women pursuing careers. She received the Strickland-Daniel Award for Distinguished Mentoring in 2011, the Carolyn Sherif Award from the Society for the Psychology of Women in 1998, and the John Holland Award for Outstanding Achievement in Career and Personality Research in 1989. Gilbert is a fellow of the Association for Psychological Science and the American Psychological Association.

== Biography ==
Gilbert was born in Brooklyn, New York. She completed her undergraduate degree in chemistry at Wells College, and her Master of Science degree in chemistry at Yale University. She continued her education at the University of Texas at Austin, where she obtain a PhD in Educational Psychology in 1974 under the supervision of Janet Taylor Spence. She was a member of the faculty at Iowa State University (1973–1975), The University of Texas at Austin (1975–2006), and Santa Clara University (2006–2017). At UT Austin, Gilbert was appointed the Frank C. Erwin Jr. Centennial Honors Professor in Educational Psychology and served as the Vice Provost for Undergraduate Studies. Gilbert joined the faculty of Santa Clara University in 2006, where she served as the Provost and Vice President for Academic Affairs from 2006 to 2010.

== Research ==
Gilbert's seminal work has focused on men and women in two-career families, i.e., where both parents have paid employment, and the impact of both parents being employed on parenting, household work, and career paths. Her research has examined personal factors, such as interests and abilities, relationship factors, such as power-dynamics and partner support, and societal factors, such as workplace policies, the availability of child care, mentorship and other forms of support, as influences on men and women's occupational and family roles.

Gilbert has authored several books on dual career families and related topics. She published the first and only empirically based book to date on men in dual-career families, Men in Dual-career Families: Current Realities and Future Prospects (1985). Later books include Sharing it All: The Rewards and Struggles of Two-Career Families (1988), Two Careers, One Family: The Promise of Gender Equality (1993), and Gender and Sex in Counseling and Psychotherapy (with Murray Scher).

In recent years, Gilbert has collaborated with her husband, John C. Gilbert, on research focusing on the careers of women working in the traditionally male-dominated field of winemaking, and their progress. Their research documented that 9.8% of California wineries have a lead woman winemaker, and that proportional to their representation in the field, wineries whose lead winemakers are women are more highly acclaimed – an indicator that women were able to succeed in this male-dominated field.

They also developed an extensive educational website that provides biographical profiles of women winemakers in California and other important wine regions of the world. The Women Winemakers of California and Beyond website is being archived by the Department of Archives and Special Collections at the UC Davis Library for its Viticulture and Enology Collection.

== Representative Publications ==
- Dancer, L. S., & Gilbert, L. A. (1993). Spouses' family work participation and its relation to wives' occupational level. Sex Roles, 28(3–4), 127–145.
- Gilbert, L. A. (1992). Gender and counseling psychology: Current knowledge and directions for research and social action. In S. D. Brown & R. W. Lent (Eds.), Handbook of counseling psychology (pp. 383–416). Oxford, England: John Wiley & Sons.
- Gilbert, L. A. (1994). Current perspectives on dual-career families. Current Directions in Psychological Science, 3(4), 101–105.
- Gilbert, L. A. (1994). Reclaiming and returning gender to context: Examples from studies of heterosexual dual‐earner families. Psychology of Women Quarterly, 18(4), 539–558.
- Gilbert, L. A. (2006). Two-career relationships. In J.H. Greenhaus and G.A. Callanan (Eds.), Encyclopedia of career development (pp. 822–828). Thousand Oaks, CA: Sage Publications.
- Gilbert, L. A., & Buckner, C. E. (2017). Paving the Way: The Distinctive Mentoring Style of Janet Taylor Spence. Sex Roles, 77, 11–12.
- Gilbert, L. A., & Gilbert, J. C. (2017, March 15). California's Trailblazing Women Winemakers: The First 20 Years (1965 through 1984). Grape Collective, No. 137.
- Gilbert, L. A. & Gilbert, J. C. (2020). Women Winemakers: Personal Odysseys. Eugene, OR: Luminare Press.
- Gilbert, L. A., & Rachlin, V. (1987). Mental health and psychological functioning of dual-career families. The Counseling Psychologist, 15(1), 7-49.
- Gilbert, L. A., & Rader, J. (2008). Work, family, and dual-earner couples: Implications for research and practice. In Brown, S. D., & Lent, R.W. (Eds.) Handbook of counseling psychology (4th Ed.) (pp. 426–443). Hoboken, NJ: John Wiley.
