= Melba J. T. Vasquez =

American psychologist (born 1951)

- Born: February 27, 1951 (age 75)
- Occupations: Psychologist, former president of the American Psychological Association
- Awards: APA Award for Lifetime Contributions to Psychology (2020)

Melba Jean Trinidad Vasquez (born February 27, 1951) is an American psychologist who served as the 2011 president of the American Psychological Association (APA). Vasquez was the APA's first Latina president. She has authored multiple works on ethics in psychotherapy. She is a first-generation college student who was encouraged to pursue a Doctorate in Counseling. She has been in private Independent Practice in Texas since 1991.

== Career ==
Melba J. T. Vasquez attended Southwest Texas State University (now Texas State University-San Marcos) and majored in English and political science. She was a middle school English and political science teacher before beginning a psychology career. She received a PhD in counseling psychology from The University of Texas in 1978, then worked at the university's counseling center. She taught psychology both at The University of Texas and at Colorado State University before moving into private practice. She has been in practice in Austin, Texas since 1991.

When Vasquez was elected president of the APA in 2011, she became the first Latina elected to the position. During her presidency, she created three tasks forces that covered issues related to immigration, racism, and educational disparities. The task forces focused on understanding the psychological issues surrounding the experiences of immigrants, developing strategies on how to prevent discrimination, and using psychological research to address educational inequalities amongst minority groups. She had previously served as president of the Texas Psychological Association, the Society of Counseling Psychology (APA Division 17) and the Society for the Psychology of Women (APA Division 35). She cofounded the Society for the Psychological Study of Ethnic Minority Issues (APA Division 45). She coauthored Ethics for Psychologists: A Commentary on the APA Ethics Code and four editions of Ethics in Psychotherapy and Counseling: A Practical Guide. Vazquez is a member of divisions 9 (Society for the Psychological Study of Social Issues), 31 (Advocacy for Psychology), 44 (Psychology of Sexual Orientation and Gender Diversity), and 56 (Trauma Psychology). In 2007, Vasquez was recognized with the Alfred M. Wellner Senior Career Psychologist Award from the National Register of Health Service Providers in Psychology. She was also recognized as a Distinguished Practitioner of Psychology in the National Academies of Practice. She was also awarded the APA 2020 Award for Outstanding Lifetime Contributions to Psychology after her 2011 presidency. In 1999, Vasquez co-founded the National Multicultural Conference and Summit (NMCS) along with Gwendolyn P. Keita, Lilian Comas-Diaz, and Derald Wing Sue, which still is conducted-Most recently in Santa Fe, NM, 2024. The purpose of this conference is for various professionals in psychology to come together, and provide insights based on research and real-world experience. In 2017, Dr. Vasquez began serving as the Vice President of the American Psychological Foundation, and was appointed as President in 2024.As President she has helped launch initiatives, such as the Direct Action Initiative, that helps communities in need by increasing access to psychological science and expertise. In 2025, she was the opening plenery speaker at the American Group Psychotherapy Association's annual conference where she spoke on multicultural psychotherapy.
