= Psychologists League =

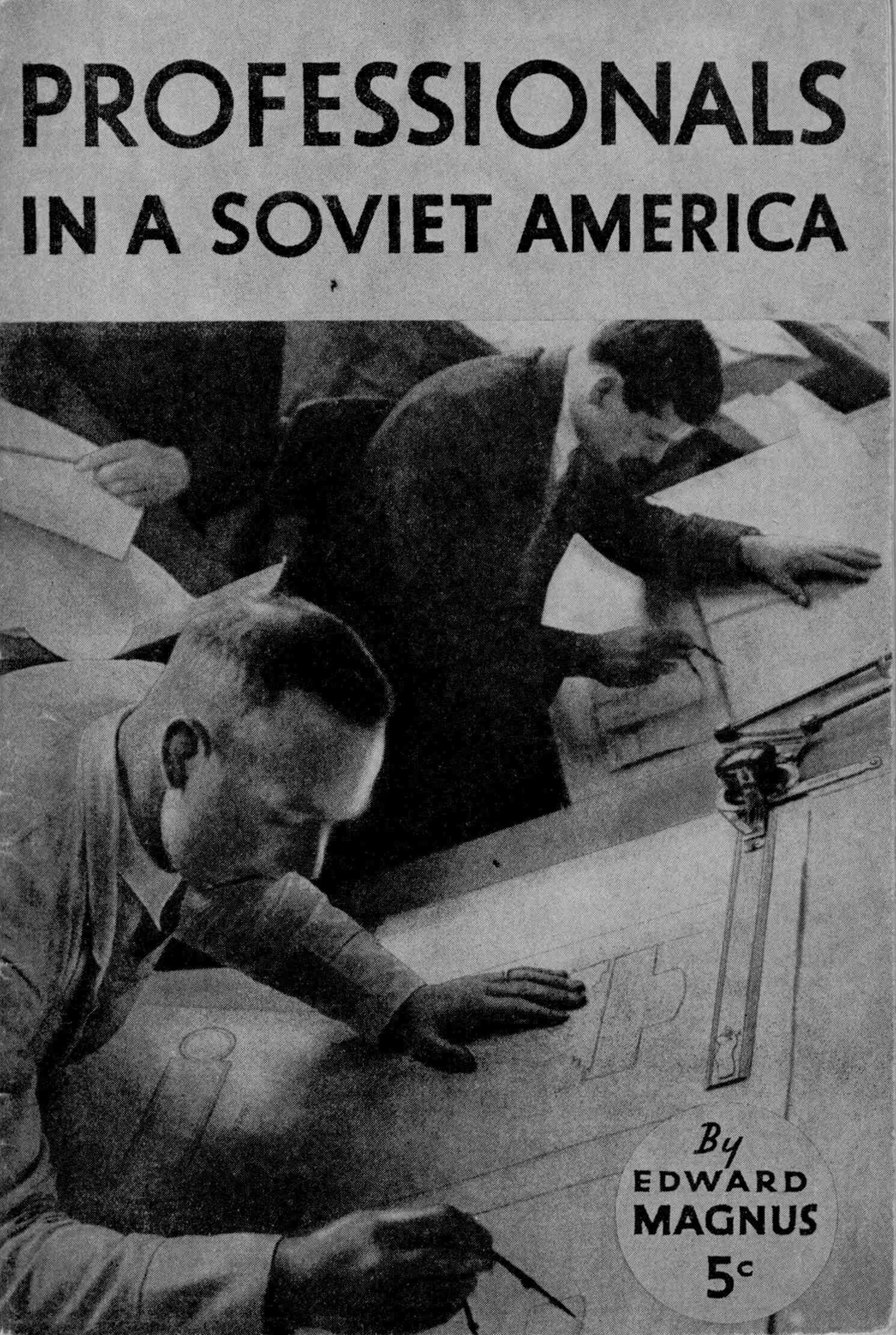

The Psychologists League was an organization of politically progressive psychologists that advocated for unemployed and under-employed psychologists during the Great Depression of the 1930s. Its larger purpose was to bring psychologists into the Marxist-led movement of radicalizing scientists and clinicians.

== History ==
The League was created in the style of the Popular Front. A small group of psychologists active in the communist movement called a meeting for January 16, 1935 in the Bellevue Hospital’s psychiatry auditorium. It drew an audience of 200 psychologists and featured speakers chosen to represent the socialist and communist movements, and a variety of academic and clinical fields. At the end of the evening, thirty members of the audience volunteered to form an organization combining political activism with reformist pressure within psychology, which would become the Psychologists League. Mary Bressler became its Secretary, its Chairman was Solomon Machover. Solomon Diamond served as Head of Programs and Publications. Diamond als led other Popular Front organizations, writing under the name Albert Magnus.

As a Marxist group with Communist sympathies, it aimed to create more employment opportunities for psychologists as well as alter the methods and intellectual content of psychology.

The League ridiculed conservative appeals to objectivity and neutrality, criticized elitist assumptions in existing schools of thought, and called for new theories that would stress psychological change and transformation as understood in through a broad lens. As League member Goodwin Watson explained at a 1936 forum, narrowly focused disciplines were incapable of dealing with the current social crisis, which he compared to a "sinking ship full of holes and rapidly filling with water." In Watson's analogy, "sinkologists" absorbed themselves with intensive research on how to repair the ship, while the "sinkiatrists" rushed [in] with all sizes of buckets to scoop the water out, but no solution was reached. Why not scrap the ship and get a new one? ... A system which rehabilitates in [a therapist's] office and sends the delinquent back to a bad home environment without provision for a job is wasted energy. We must deal with society directly".

Although the Psychologists League did manage to create some job opportunities for psychologists, especially through the Works Progress Administration, in its more ambitious goals it proved to be less successful. In fact its influence on the policies of the American Psychological Association was largely negligible.

The League also fell victim to the sectarian politics of the Communist Party. When the Communist faction in the League refused to let the organization vote on the Soviet invasion of Finland, the League's president, Dan Harris, resigned. By 1941, the League became a shell of its former self, existing chiefly as a few dozen members with unshakable faith in the Communist Party's politics.
