= Harriette Pipes McAdoo =

- Born: March 15, 1940; Fort Valley, Georgia
- Died: December 21, 2009 (aged 69); East Lansing, Michigan
- Education: Michigan State University, University of Michigan,
- Scientific career
- Fields: Sociology; African-American studies
- Workplaces: Michigan State University, Howard University

Harriette Pipes McAdoo (March 15, 1940 – December 21, 2009) was an American sociologist and a distinguished professor at Michigan State University. She and her husband, John Lewis McAdoo, engaged in research concerning African-American families. She was the author of a well-regarded anthology, Black Families.

== Early life ==
McAdoo was the first of three children born to William Harrison Pipes and Anne Howard Russell Pipes. She was born in the infirmary of Fort Valley State College. William Pipes taught at Fort Valley State and several other colleges, was president of Alcorn College and became the first African-American professor at Michigan State University. When McAdoo was a small child, her mother worked as a domestic servant in spite of having a master's degree because of poor job prospects for black people at the time.

McAdoo grew up mostly in Little Rock, Arkansas, but her family moved to East Lansing, Michigan, when she was a teenager, and she finished high school there. Dr. McAdoo was a member of the sorority Alpha Kappa Alpha. She traveled often to conduct multicultural studies, completing research in Zimbabwe, Ghana, Kenya, and sang in multiple groups, including the MSU Choral Union, the Earl Nelson Singers, and All Souls Church Choir. She was a member Ann Arbor Friends Meeting, Red Cedar Friends Meeting, and All Souls Church, Unitarian. McAdoo earned undergraduate and master's degree from Michigan State University. With these degrees, McAdoo taught at Milan and Ypsilanti High School in Michigan and started the first special education classroom at Ypsilanti High School. McAdoo then received her Ph.D. in educational psychology and child development from the University of Michigan and worked towards professorship at Howard University. She also did postdoctoral work at Harvard University.

== Career ==
After 21 years on the faculty at Howard University in the School of Social Work, two of which she spent as acting dean, she was named a distinguished professor at Michigan State in the Department of Sociology and the School of Human Ecology. McAdoo, alongside other African American faculty, was instrumental in the launching of a PhD program for African American and African Studies at Michigan State—serving as a member of the executive board. McAdoo was also the first African American to be elected to the Board of Directors of the Groves Conference on Marriage and the Family. She also held visiting professorships at several institutions, including Smith College and the University of Washington.

McAdoo and her husband, researcher John Lewis McAdoo, started working on the Family Life Project in the 1970s. The project was an attempt to study African-American families. Her concepts in research focused on leaving behind the "deficit orientation"—which had been a prominent approach to the study of most U.S. African American families and other ethnic families. The couple felt that most of the sociological evidence on this subject reinforced long-held stereotypes because many studies were derived from dysfunctional families who had contact with agencies such as prisons and drug treatment programs rather than from middle-class families. McAdoo and her husband systematically looked at middle-class black families in Washington, D.C.

The Association of Black Psychologists named McAdoo its 1978 Outstanding Researcher of the Year. From 1989 and 1990, McAdoo served on the Social Science Advisory Board for the Poverty Race Research Action Council to inform civil rights policy. During the Carter administration, McAdoo was an appointee to the White House Conference on Families. In 1994, McAdoo was the president of the National Council on Family Relations (NCFR)--receiving the first Marie Peters Award for Outstanding Scholarship, Leadership and Service in the Area of Ethnic Minority families as well as the Ernest Burgess Award in 2004. She was the editor of a four-volume anthology known as Black Families. She and her husband established the Empirical Conference on Black Psychology.

== Research ==
One facet of McAdoo's research was based on providing models to study child development in minority populations by placing the focus of her model at the intersection of race, culture, ethnicity, and social class. She did this in her study "An Integrative Model for Study of Developmental Competencies in Minority Children". She also provided an evaluation of the framework that has been used to study minority children and families. She used her examination to provide a conceptual model for child development, based in her studies of racism, oppression, and segregation on minority children and families. This research by McAdoo provides a resilience perspective rather than a deficit perspective to minority children when studying child development. The integrative model proposed by McAdoo and her colleagues utilizes adaptive culture to represent the ways marginalized families express personalized freedom in their experiences in society. The integrative model is still utilized in many studies of child development for minority children today.

In another area of McAdoo's research, she used data from report cards for Black and White students to study the difference in transition to schools and parental involvements effects on learning. She also discovered different social structures effects on the early schooling process and development. This research was used to study other effects on development for minority children in schools. In one continuation of this research, data was taken from the Early Child Longitudinal Study- Kindergarten Cohort to study different factors that can correlate classroom competition and children's academic and socioemotional functioning in transitioning to elementary school. Researchers studied the factors of parental involvement and communication quality and the relationship between these two. This research showed that greater diversity promoted more parental involvement for students with same-race representation in classrooms. These factors, in turn, promoted children's reading and interpersonal skills.

McAdoo was also involved in research topics surrounding global public health. This research centered around micronutrient levels of pregnant women in Harare, Zimbabwe who were affected by HIV-1 and measles virus. This offered further development in the study of nutrition and clinical epidemiology. This research was used to offer further considerations as to the incomplete understanding of HIV distribution in Africa, the diversity of the HIV virus, and the need for continual research and surveillance.

== Death and legacy ==
McAdoo died unexpectedly in 2009. She was predeceased by her husband and is survived by four children, five grandchildren, and several relatives.

The legacy of McAdoo's research and professorship is found in her commitment to expanding the existing knowledge on the black families from a strengths-based perspective. McAdoo's work served to highlight a multitude of experiences held by black American families of varying family histories, socioeconomic statuses, and demographic contexts. Contralateral to the monolithic and deficit-oriented views on Black families at the time (which can be observed in literature like Daniel Patrick Moynihan's report in 1965). It challenged beliefs held by many psychologists in the mid-twentieth century. It also informed policies surrounding the Black families and laid the groundwork for other strengths-based initiatives like the African American Child and Family Research Center, the National Research Center on Hispanic Children and Families, and the American Indian Alaska Native Family and Child Experiences Survey.

The PhD program for African American and African Studies that McAdoo helped establish in 2002 at Michigan State has now developed into a department with two fully appointed teaching professors. The National Council on Family Relations awards the John L. and Harriette P. McAdoo Dissertation Award to recognize doctoral dissertations that relate to ethnic minority families. In 2018, Ijeoma Opara was named the recipient of the John L. and Harriette P. McAdoo Dissertation Award for her work on highlighting protective factors for drug use and sexual risk behavior prevention among Black and Hispanic female adolescents. The recipient in 2020 was Azucena Versin, PhD for her research on minority families, with a focus on issues of motherhood.
