= Pacific Islands Families Study =

The Pacific Islands Families Study is a long-running, cohort study of 1398 children (and their parents) of Pacific Islands origin born in Auckland, New Zealand during the year 2000. The cohort of participants was selected from babies born between 15 March 2000 and 17 December 2000 at Middlemore Hospital with at least one parent identifying as having Pacific Islands origin.

The three overall objectives of the PIF Study are:

1. to provide information on Pacific peoples' health, and the cultural, economic, environmental and psychosocial factors that are associated with child health and development outcomes and family functioning,
2. to determine how such factors individually and interactively influence positive and negative child, parent and family outcomes over time,
3. to provide information that will help set quantifiable targets for Pacific peoples' health.

The study has collected data from mothers, fathers, children and teachers. Data collection phases have occurred at 6 weeks after birth, 12 months, 24 months, 4 years, 6 years and 9 years.

The study is administered within the Faculty of Health and Environmental Sciences at Auckland University of Technology. Major funding has been provided by the Foundation for Research, Science and Technology and the Health Research Council of New Zealand.

== Data Collection Phases ==
=== First Two Years of Life ===
At approximately 6 weeks after birth, data were collected from interviews of the primary caregiver (usually the birth mother) and the collateral caregiver (the partner of the primary, usually the father). Data were collected from 1376 families in relation to 1398 children (including 22 pairs of twins). The ethnic mix of the original cohort was 47% Samoan, 21% Tongan, 17% Cook Island Maori, 4% Niuean and 11% other Pacific or non-Pacific.

At 12 months of age, 1224 primary caregivers and 825 collateral caregivers were interviewed in relation to 1241 children. At 24 months, 1144 primary caregivers and 854 collateral caregivers were interviewed in relation to 1162 children.

Details of the first two years can be found in a technical report.

=== Transition to School ===
At the age of 4 years, data were collected from primary caregiver interviews and separate child assessments. At the age of 6 years, data were collected from primary caregiver interviews, collateral caregiver interviews, child assessments and teacher evaluations.

=== Towards Adolescence ===
As each child turned 9, data were collected from primary caregiver interviews, child assessments and teacher child evaluations. As of June 2011, data on 11-year-olds are being collected from primary and collateral caregiver interviews, child assessments and teacher evaluations.

== Key achievements ==
=== Retention of Participants ===
At 6 weeks of age, a total of 1,376 mothers (of 1398 children, including 22 pairs of twins) were interviewed. Of those, 1224 (89%) participated at 12-months and 1144 (83%) participated at 24-months. No important differential attrition was observed.

=== Publications of research results ===
Key findings for the first seven years are given in a summary of findings brochure.

Research topics resulting from the study include post natal depression, chronic middle ear disease, intimate partner violence, obesity, gambling, child behaviour, mental health and smacking.
