= Isabelle Kendig =

Clinical psychologist

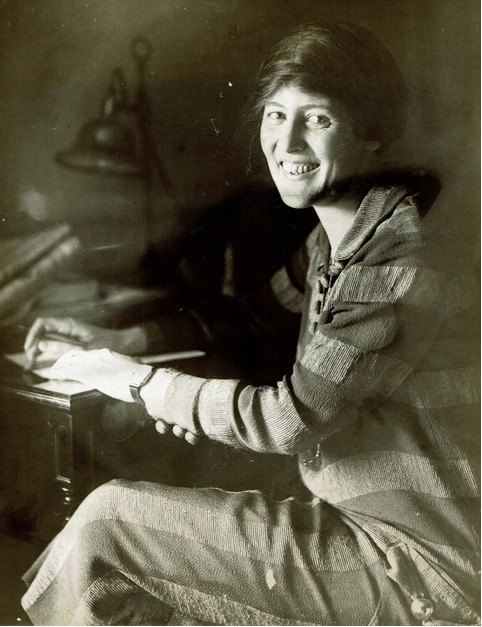

Isabelle Kendig was a prominent clinical psychologist in the mid-20th century United States. She was best known as Head Psychologist at St. Elizabeths Hospital in Washington, D.C. In that role she was part of a cohort of senior clinicians that helped guide the expansion of clinical psychology in the post-WWII era. She also qualified as a member of the second generation of women psychologists in the U.S.

Less well known than Kendig's clinical career are the two other careers that preceded her doctoral studies and PhD. She began as a eugenic field worker in 1912, investigating alleged hereditary defects in the Pratt family of Shutesbury Massachusetts. This was followed by living in Washington, D.C., working as a campaigner for women's rights, anti-militarism, and socialism.

In all these careers and her personal life, Kendig was an outspoken feminist who dealt with the struggle for a career and personal life free of patriarchal constraints.

== Education ==
Isabelle Kendig was educated at St. Xavier’s Academy in Chicago, a Catholic school. After high school, she attended Cook County Normal School, a teachers college known for its progressive philosophy and connections to Chicago’s poor and immigrant populations. Next, she became an elementary school teacher in the Chicago public schools. She then attended Oberlin College, graduating Phi Beta Kappa. Later, she obtained a M.A. and PhD at Radcliffe College. She studied and conducted research at the Harvard Psychological Clinic under its director Henry Murray, who became a lifelong friend. As Murray's biographer described, she was a prominent member of a group of researchers that included future leaders of the field of clinical and personality psychology, including Saul Rosenzweig, Robert W. White, and Erik Erikson.

== Career ==
Kendig began as a eugenic field worker, trained at the Eugenics Record Office in Long Island. Field work in eugenics was a popular job for young people, particularly women, who wanted to improve society by investigating the connection between heredity and social problems. Skeptical of the assumptions of hard-line eugenicists, Kendig produced data that contradicted their basic beliefs. When she presented her research to Charles Davenport and other social scientists concerned with social defect, Kendig was shunned by Davenport, who, in turn, falsified her findings to fit his beliefs. She gave up her role as researcher and became an executive secretary for a state-wide social service agency in Massachusetts, League for Preventive Work, advocating for a new institution for people with intellectually disabilities (then known as the feebleminded), and worked for the Children's Commission in New Hampshire for similar aims. She later resigned from the League of Preventive Work in 1916, so she could get a degree in law from the Cambridge Law School for Women, said to be the first graduate school "exclusively for women" in the U.S.

She then worked for socialist, feminist, and anti-militarist organizations in Washington, D.C. In the National Women’s Party, Kendig was a field organizer and its Legislative and Organizational Secretary, for which she received a salary. She lobbied and helped organize local groups in the South and created equal rights publicity material for a national audience. She also created the NWP’s Councils for various professions and its Homemakers’ Council—a forum in which policies on marriage and family could be created. Alice Paul later described Kendig as an "extraordinary good organizer" and praised her efforts at expanding the NWP membership.

After leaving the Women's Party, Kendig gained national recognition as a founder and Executive Secretary of the Women’s Committee for Political Action. This national organization of socialists, feminists, and anti-militarists was founded to make sure women’s interests were represented in preparations for the election of 1924. A goal of the WCPA was to create a strong female presence within a larger group: the Conference on Progressive Political Action (CPPA), which launched the Presidential campaign for Robert M. La Follette.

Kendig also worked for the anti-militarist National Council for the Prevention of War as a researcher and author. Among her projects was a survey and critique of the portrayal of war in history textbooks, which activists could use to argue for less militaristic schools. Kendig also served as the ACLU's Washington Representative, and organized a campaign to oppose a bill for the registration and deportation of aliens, testifying before the relevant Congressional committee, among other tasks.

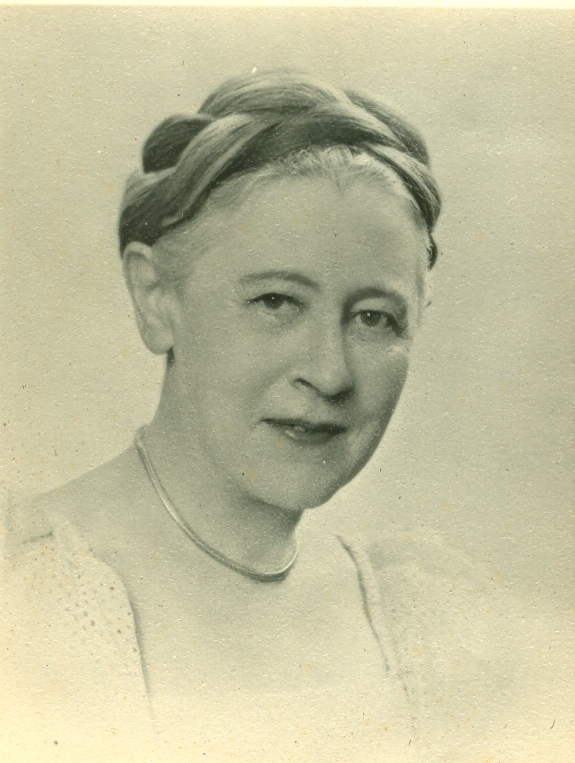

Her final career was as a clinical psychologist. In 1933, she earned a degree in the field from Radcliffe College. Later, she rose to the rank of Head of Psychology at St. Elizabeths Hospital in Washington, D.C. She made history there by giving projective tests to the hospital's most famous patient, the poet Ezra Pound. She also taught at George Washington University Medical School and Catholic University. In the 1940s, Kendig published widely on assessment and psychopathology and completed a book on intellectual deterioration in schizophrenia that had been begun by William Alanson White, former superintendent at St. Elizabeths. The book was entitled Psychological studies in dementia praecox. After World War II, she helped lead the field of clinical psychology, locally and nationally, as it expanded its scientific and social influence.

Kendig died in 1974 in Siasconset, Nantucket, and was survived by her husband, who died in 1989, and children.

== Personal life ==
In 1915, Kendig married Howard Belding Gill, who became a prominent criminologist. A year before they married, Kendig and Gill began planning how they could each have a career, a home life, and children. Later, Kendig offered advice on how women could maintain some financial independence in their marriage. They had four children. This included three boys, including Benjamin Franklin Gill in November 1917, Jonathan Belding Gill in October 1919, Peter Lawrence Gill in February 1921, and Joan Kendig Gill in November 1925.

In a 1975 interview, Alice Paul noted that, at first, Kendig was called "Sally Gill", but changed her mind, insisting that fellow NWP members use the name "Isabel Kendig" instead. Paul also stated that while Kendig was a "well-wisher" for the organization, Kendig was drawn "into her own family life" after leaving NWP. Kendig was also known by the names of "Isabelle Kendig-Gill", "Isabelle V. Kendig Gill", and "Sally".
