= Raymond D. Fowler =

American Psychologist (1930-2015)

- Born: December 22, 1930; Jasper, Alabama, US
- Died: March 17, 2015 (aged 84); San Diego, California, US
- Occupations: Professor Emeritus, University of Alabama. Adjunct Professor, San Diego State University. Former Executive V.P., CEO, American Psychological Association
- Spouse: Sandra Mumford Fowler
- Children: Karen, Derek, and Michael Fowler; James and Monica Mumford
- Awards: APA Award for Lifetime Contributions to Psychology (2000)

Raymond D. Fowler (December 22, 1930 – March 17, 2015) was an American psychologist and Professor Emeritus of the University of Alabama. He was president of the American Psychological Association (1988) and served as APA's executive vice president and chief executive officer (CEO) from 1989 to 2003.

== Early life ==
Fowler was born in Jasper, Alabama, a small coal mining town in the mountainous north central region of the state. His mother was a public school teacher. His father was an accountant and later director of the Alabama State Retirement System. Fowler was educated in the public schools of Alabama. He received a BA degree in 1952 and an MA degree in 1953 in psychology from the University of Alabama in Tuscaloosa. He received his PhD in psychology with specialization in clinical psychology from the Pennsylvania State University in 1957.

== Career ==
In 1956, Fowler joined the faculty of the University of Alabama, where he remained until 1986, when he was appointed professor emeritus. From 1965 to 1983, he served as department head. In 1987, he was appointed professor and head of the psychology department at the University of Tennessee, where he served until June 1989, when he assumed his position as APA executive vice president and chief executive officer.

Fowler has been recognized for his work in the areas of substance abuse, criminal behavior and personality assessment. In the early 1960s, he developed a method of computer interpretation for the Minnesota Multiphasic Personality Inventory. He was appointed in 1976 by Federal District Judge Frank M. Johnson, Jr. to direct a court - ordered prison reform program that included assessing every prisoner in the Alabama prison system and recommending educational and rehabilitation programs for them. That same year, Fowler was retained by the estate of Howard R. Hughes, who had died without a will, to determine his mental status at various periods of his life.

From 1998 to 2006, Fowler was treasurer of the International Association of Applied Psychology (IAAP) and a member of its executive committee. In 2000, the American Board of Professional Psychology gave Fowler its award for Distinguished Service and Contributions to the Profession of Psychology. He is a distinguished member of PSI CHI International Honor Society for Psychology.

At the state and national level, Fowler had been a member of the National Advisory Committee on Alcoholism of the Department of Health, Education and Welfare. He was a task force member of the President's Commission on Mental Health and was an invited participant to the White House Conference on Health and the National Conference on Criminal Justice Standards and Goals. He had been a consultant to the director of the Law Enforcement Assistance Administration, the Veterans Administration, and the National Institute of Alcohol Abuse and Alcoholism. From 1965 to 1968 he was vice-president of the Council on Human Relations, the first biracial human rights group in Alabama.

== American Psychological Association ==
Fowler served as APA treasurer (1982–1987, became its 97th president in 1988 and served as executive vice president and chief executive officer from 1989 to 2003.

In 2003, the APA established two Raymond D. Fowler Awards in his honor. These awards are given annually to a member and to a staff member who has made "a significant and enduring impact on APA as an organization and who has shown a clear dedication to advancing APA's mission".

In 1998, the Psychological Bulletin of the APA published Rind et al., a meta-analytic article indicating that suffering childhood sexual abuse does not automatically cause great and lasting harm, as was sometimes believed. The article caught the attention of the media, including Laura Schlessinger on the Dr. Laura Program, and was misrepresented as condoning sexual contact with children. Historian Alice Dreger faulted Fowler for caving into political pressure and calling for an external review of the article instead of defending the scientific and peer review process. The external review was submitted to the American Association for the Advancement of Science, which responded by defending those processes.

== Personal life ==
Fowler was married to Sandra Mumford Fowler, who specializes in intercultural psychology. They had a blended family of five children and five grandchildren. In 2006, an autobiography of Fowler was published in the Journal of Personality Assessment. Fowler died on March 17, 2015.

== Selected publications ==
- Fowler, R. D., Jr. (1967). Computer interpretation of personality tests: The automated psychologist. Comprehensive Psychiatry, 8(6), 455-467.
- Fowler, R. D., Jr., & Marlow, G. H. (1968). A computer program for personality analysis. Behavioral Science, 13(5), 413-416.
- Fowler, R. D., Jr. (1969). Current status of computer interpretation of psychological tests. American Journal of Psychiatry, 125 (7), (Suppl.), 21-27.
- Fowler, R. D. Jr., & Miller, M. L. (1969). Computer interpretation of the MMPI: Its use in clinical practice. Archives of General Psychiatry, 21, 502-508.
- Webb, J. T., Miller, M. L., & Fowler, R. D., Jr. (1970). Extending professional time: A computerized MMPI interpretation service. Journal of Clinical Psychology, 26(2), 210-214.
- Fowler, R. D., Jr. (1985). Landmarks in computer assisted psychological assessment. Journal of Clinical and Consulting Psychology, 53(6), 748-759.
- Fowler, R. D., Jr., (1986). Howard Hughes: A psychological autopsy. Psychology Today, 20(5), 22-33.
- Fowler, R. D. Jr., (1987). Developing a computerized interpretation system. In J. N. Butcher (Ed.). Computerized psychological assessment. New York, NY: Basic Books.
- Fowler, R. D., (2006). Computers, criminals, an eccentric billionaire and APA: A brief autobiography. Journal of Personality Assessment, 87(3), 234-248.

Educational offices
Preceded by Bonnie Strickland	97th President of the American Psychological Association; 1988-89	Succeeded by Joseph Matarazzo
Preceded by Unknown	CEO & Executive V.P. American Psychological Association; 1989 - December 31, 2002	Succeeded by Norman B. Anderson, Ph.D.
