= American Psychological Foundation =

Psychology-oriented philanthropic organization

- Abbreviation: APF
- Formation: 1953
- Type: Nonprofit Organization
- Legal status: Foundation; 501(c)(3)
- Professional title: American Psychological Foundation (APF)
- Headquarters: Washington, DC
- Fields: Psychology
- Board President: Melba Vasquez, PhD, ABPP
- CEO: Michelle Quist Ryder, PhD
- Board of directors: https://ampsychfdn.org/about/apf-trustees/
- Main organ: Board of Trustees
- Revenue: $3.5M USD (2026)
- Disbursements: $2.65M USD
- Expenses: $2.78M USD (2026)
- Staff: 13 (2026)
- Website: https://ampsychfdn.org/

The American Psychological Foundation (abbreviated APF) was founded in 1953 as an independently incorporated grant making foundation focused on supporting the field of psychology. APF is dedicated to awarding research grants to psychologists in the early stages of their careers.

== History ==
The American Psychological Foundation was established in 1953 by six psychologists. One of the APF's founders was Joseph McVicker Hunt, who went on to serve as its first president. Other past presidents of the foundation include Dorothy Cantor, who oversaw the organization's first major fundraising campaigns. Terence M. Keane took over as president in 2017 and served through 2023. Melba Vasquez became president in 2023.

Though separate organizations, the American Psychological Foundation and the American Psychological Association have worked closely together over the past several decades to advance the field of psychology and support the careers of psychologists.
