= David L. Wodrich =

American psychologist

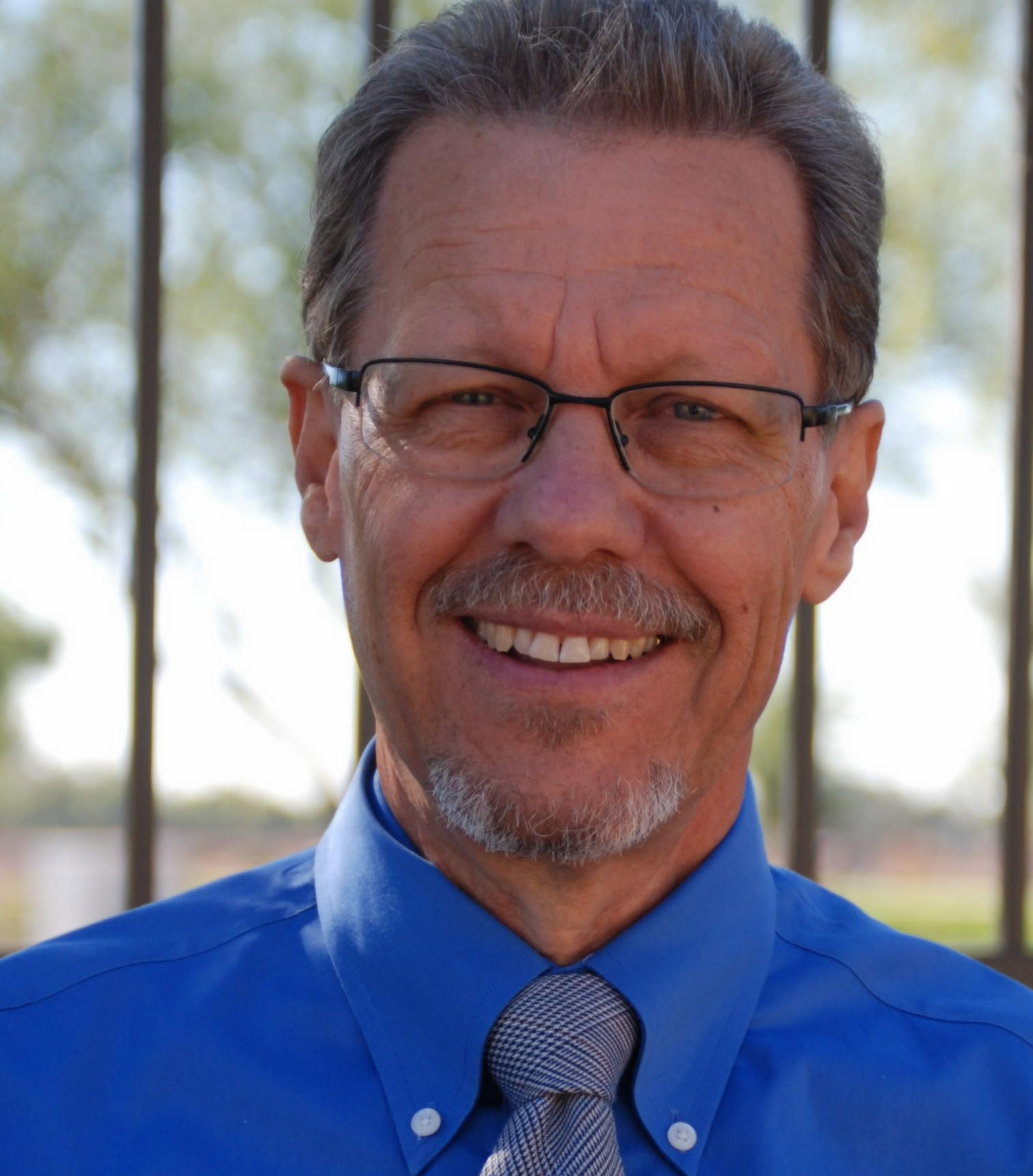
David L. Wodrich in 2014

David L Wodrich is an American psychologist, professor, researcher, and author. He is currently professor emeritus in the Department of Disability and Psychoeducational Studies at the University of Arizona. He previously held the Mary Emily Warner Professorship of Psychology in Education at Arizona State University.

Professor Wodrich has authored several books on learning disabilities and psychoeducational assessment/intervention, including a structured methodology for detecting the nature of students' learning problems and matching their needs to empirically supported educational interventions. Besides publications concerning the impact of learning disabilities at school, Dr. Wodrich has conducted research regarding the effects of pediatric illness in the classroom.

He was previously editor-in-chief of the Journal of Applied School Psychology. He is a fellow of the American Psychological Association and the American Academy of School Psychology as well as a diplomate of the American Board of Professional Psychology, and past president of the Brain, Neuroscience, and Education SIG of the American Educational Research Association. At present, he also provides continuing education and pre-service/in-service training for psychologists, educators, pediatricians, and psychiatrists.

== Publications ==
- Wodrich, D. L., (2009. "Announcement of the incoming editor-in-chief: Addressing school psychology's need for rigorous scholarship with applied value". Journal of Applied School Psychology, 25, 1–5. doi:10.1080/15377900902761422
- Wodrich, D. L. & Schmitt, A. J. (2006). Patterns of learning disorders: Working systematically from assessment to intervention. New York: Guilford Press. Patterns of Learning Disorders: Working Systematically from Assessment to Intervention
- Wodrich, D. L., Schmitt, A. J., & Goldberg, J. (2010). "Using neuropsychological instruments in school settings: Possibilities and limitations". In E. Arzubi & E. Mambrino (Eds.) A guide to neuropsychological testing for health care professionals (pp. 199–228). New York: Springer.
- Wodrich, D. L., Spencer, M. L. S., & Daley, K. B. (2006). "Combining use of RTI and psychoeducational testing: What we must assume to do otherwise". Psychology in the Schools, 43, 798–806.
- Wodrich, D. L., Kaplan, A. M., & Deering, W. M. (2006). "Children with epilepsy in school: Special service usage and assessment practices". Psychology in the Schools, 43, 169–181.
