= Howard Kassinove =

American psychologist

- Education: Adelphi University; Temple School of Medicine
- Scientific career
- Fields: Psychology

Howard Kassinove is a ABPP certified psychologist who works in the area of anger and anger management. Licensed in the state of New York, he resides with his wife in Rancho Mirage, California. Kassinove has been an invited speaker in many countries including Argentina, Greece, India, Korea, Romania, Taiwan, and Russia.

== Early life ==
Howard Kassinove was born in New York, New York on March 1, 1941. His childhood in the Bronx and Queens was relatively uneventful. After graduating from high school, Kassinove attended Hofstra University Temple University and then attended Adelphi University, and earned a PhD.

== Education ==
Kassinove earned his PhD in Behavior Research from Adelphi University's Institute of Advanced Psychological Studies in 1970. He then completed a Certificate program in Behavior Therapy at the Temple University School of Medicine.

== Institutional affiliations ==
Prior to his retirement in 2017, Kassinove was a full professor of psychology at Hofstra University where he founded and served as Director of the Institute for the Study and Treatment of Anger and Aggression. He is a Fellow of the American Psychological Association, a Fellow of the Association for Psychological Science, a Certified School Psychologist, a Fellow of the Albert Ellis Institute for Rational Emotive Therapy, a Board Certified Clinical Psychologist (ABPP), and a Board Certified Cognitive and Behavioral Psychologist (ABPP).

Since the time of his retirement, Professor Kassinove has continued to give lectures, supervise research, and publish books about anger and how it can be managed. In 2017, he was a recipient of the Elizabeth Hurlock Beckman Award for inspiring a student (Dr. Ryan Quirk) to make a significant and lasting contribution to society.

== Bibliography ==
Anger Management: The Complete Treatment Guidebook for Practitioners (Impact Publishers, The Practical Therapist Series) (2002) with Raymond Chip Tafrate. ISBN 1-886230-45-5
Anger Disorders: Definition, Diagnosis, and Treatment. (1995). Taylor and Francis Publishers. ISBN 1-56032-353-1
Anger Management for Everyone (Impact Publishers) (2009). with Raymond Chip Tafrate. ISBN 1-88623-083-8
