= Gerald Koocher =

American psychologist

Gerald P. Koocher
- Born: Gerald P. Koocher; 1948 (age 77–78)
- Education: Boston University (AB); University of Missouri (PhD)
- Known for: Ethics in psychology; pediatric psychology; professional standards in mental health practice
- Awards: President of the American Psychological Association (2006)
- Scientific career
- Fields: Clinical psychology, forensic psychology, professional ethics
- Institutions: Harvard Medical School; Boston Children's Hospital

Gerald Paul Koocher (born March 13, 1947) is an American psychologist and past president of the American Psychological Association (APA). His interests include ethics, clinical child psychology and the study of scientific misconduct. He is Dean Emeritus Simmons University and also holds an academic appointment at Harvard Medical School. Koocher has over 350 publications including 18 books and has edited three scholarly journals including Ethics & Behavior which he founded. The APA’s Hoffman Report discussed Koocher’s involvement in drafting memoranda related to policies on psychologist participation in national-security interrogations. Koocher has disputed interpretations that he supported abusive practices, stating that he has consistently opposed psychologists’ involvement in torture and pointing to his publications on professional ethics. He issued a six-page joint-rebuttal, criticizing the ‘unfounded conclusions’ of the report.

== Biography ==
=== Career ===
Gerald Koocher earned an undergraduate degree in psychology from Boston University in 1968. He completed a master's degree (1970) and Ph.D. (1972) in clinical psychology from the University of Missouri. He worked full-time at Boston's Children's Hospital from 1971 to 2001, ultimately serving as chief of psychology. While at Boston Children's, he was an associate professor at Harvard Medical School. In June 2001 he became a professor and dean of the School of Nursing and Health Sciences at Simmons College in Boston. He later served as associate provost at Simmons, while continuing part-time service at Boston Children's Hospital and Harvard Medical School. He began serving as dean of the College of Science and Health at DePaul University on July 1, 2013. In September, 2018 he began serving as Provost and Senior Vice President for Academic Affairs at Quincy College. In August, 2022 he accepted a position as Program Director of the clinical and school psychology graduate programs at the for-profit online Capella University.

Koocher is a fellow of the American Association for the Advancement of Science and was elected a fellow of thirteen APA divisions. He is the first person to be awarded five specialty diplomas from the American Board of Professional Psychology. In 2006 he became president of the APA. He had previously served on the APA's board of directors as Treasurer of APA for ten years. Koocher is the founder of the journal Ethics & Behavior and served as editor for 26 years. He is a past editor of the Journal of Pediatric Psychology and The Clinical Psychologist.

=== Children's Understanding of Death and Loss ===
Beginning in the early 1970s while still a graduate student, Koocher began studying children's understanding of death and loss. He published several papers growing out of his doctoral dissertation research.

=== Family Coping with Chronic Illness ===
- Koocher, G. P. & O'Malley, J. E. (1981). The Damocles Syndrome: Psychosocial Consequences of Surviving Childhood Cancer. New York: McGraw Hill.
- Williams. J. & Koocher, G. P. (1999). Medical Crisis Counseling on a Pediatric Intensive Care Unit: Case Examples and Clinical Utility. Journal of Clinical Psychology in Medical Settings, 6, 249-258.
- Roberts, M.C., Koocher, G. P., Routh, D. K., & Willis, D. J. (Eds.) (1993). Readings in Pediatric Psychology. New York: Plenum.
- Koocher, G. P. & La Greca, A. M. (Eds.) (2024) Emotional First Aid for Parents: Helping children and adolescents cope with predictable life crises.(2nd Ed) New York: Oxford University Press.

=== Ethical Issues in Psychology and the Mental Health Professions ===
Koocher has developed an interest in the flip-side of the evidence based practice movement by studying discredited mental health theories, therapies, and assessment tools that have come into popular use. He has trademarked the term "Psychoquackery" and is developing popular press materials for the public. His scholarly work on these topics include:

- Koocher, G. P. (Ed.) (1976). Children’s Rights and the Mental Health Professions. New York: Wiley Interscience.
- Koocher, G. P. & Keith-Spiegel, P. C. (2008). Ethics in Psychology and the Mental Health Professions: Standards and Cases (third edition). New York: Oxford University Press.
- W. B. Johnson & Koocher, G. P. (Eds.) (2011). Ethical Conundrums, Quandaries and Predicaments n Mental Health Practice: A Casebook from the Files of Experts. New York: Oxford University Press.
- Koocher, G. P. & Keith-Spiegel, P. C. (2016). Ethics in Psychology and the Mental Health Professions: Standards and Cases (fourth edition). New York: Oxford University Press.

=== Psychoquackery: Discredited Treatments, Theories, and Tests ===
- Norcross, J. C., Koocher, G. P., & Garofalo, G. P. (2006) Discredited Psychological Treatments and Tests: A Delphi Poll. Professional Psychology: Research and Practice, 37, 515-522. doi: 10.1037/0735-7028.37.5.515
- Norcross, J. C., Koocher, G. P., Fala, N.C., & Wexler, H.K. (2010) What Doesn’t Work? Expert Consensus on Discredited Treatments in the Addictions. Journal of Addiction Medicine, 4, 174-180. DOI: 10.1097/ADM.0b013e3181c5f9db.
- Koocher, G. P., Norcross, J. C., McMann, M., & Stout, A. (2015). Consensus on Discredited Assessment and Treatment Techniques used with Children and Adolescents. Journal of Clinical Child and Adolescent Psychology, 44, 722-729. DOI: 10.1080/15374416.2014.895941
- Koocher, G. P. & Gill, E. (2016). Pet Me, Sniff Me, Squeeze Me: Quack Treatment for Autism. In R. M. Foxx & J. Mulick, J. (Eds.) Controversial Therapies for Developmental Disabilities (2nd Ed.). Philadelphia: Taylor & Francis, pp 347–356.

=== Research Ethics ===
- Melton, G.B., Koocher, G. P., & Saks, M. J. (Eds.) (1983). Children's Competence to Consent. New York: Plenum.
- Koocher, G. P. (2002). Using the CABLES Model to Assess and Minimize Risk in Research: Control Group Hazards. Ethics & Behavior, 12, 75-86.
- Keith-Spiegel, P. & Koocher, G.P. (2005). The IRB Paradox: Could the Protectors Also Encourage Deceit? Ethics & Behavior, 15, 339-350.
- Keith-Spiegel, P., Koocher, G. P, Tabachnick, B. (2006). What Scientists Want from Their Research Ethics Committees. Journal of Empirical Research on Human Research Ethics, 1, 67-82.
- Koocher, G. P. & Keith-Spiegel, P. (2010). Opinion: Peers nip misconduct in the bud. Nature, 466, 438-440. doi:10.1038/466438a
- Koocher, G. P. (2012). Colleagues as a Defense Against Bad Science. The Physiologist, 55 (2), 52-56.
- Koocher, G. P. (2014). Research Ethics and Private Harms. Journal of Interpersonal Violence. 29 (18) 2367- 3276, DOI: 10.1177/0886260514534986

== Selected works ==
- Gerald P. Koocher (Ed.). Children's Rights and the Mental Health Professions. Wiley, 1976. ISBN 0-471-01736-1.
- Patricia Keith-Spiegel, and Gerald P. Koocher. Ethics in Psychology: Professional Standards and Cases. Erlbaum, 1985. ISBN 0-8058-2128-7.
- Gerald P. Koocher and Patricia Keith-Spiegel. Children, Ethics, and the Law: Professional Issues and Cases. University of Nebraska Press, 1990. ISBN 0-8032-4731-1.
- Michael C. Roberts, Gerald P. Koocher, Donald K. Routh, Diane J. Willis (Eds.). Readings in Pediatric Psychology. Plenum Press, 1993. ISBN 0-306-44423-2.
- Gerald P. Koocher. Whistleblowing And Scientific Misconduct: A Special Issue of Ethics & Behavior. Lawrence Erlbaum Associates, 1993, ISBN 0-8058-9986-3.
- Gerald P. Koocher. Ethics in Cyberspace. Lawrence Erlbaum Associates, 1996. ISBN 0-8058-9891-3.
- Gerald P. Koocher, John C. Norcross and Sam S. Hill (Eds.). Psychologists' Desk Reference. Oxford University Press, 1998. ISBN 0-19-511186-9.
- Gerald P. Koocher (Ed.). Protection of Participants in Sensitive Social Research: A Special Issue of Ethics & Behavior. Lawrence Erlbaum Associates, 1998. ISBN 0-8058-9819-0.
- Gerald P. Koocher. The Science And Politics of Recovered Memories: A Special Issue of Ethics & Behavior. Lawrence Erlbaum Associates, 1998. ISBN 0-8058-9825-5.
- Steven N. Sparta and Gerald P. Koocher (Eds.). Forensic Mental Health Assessment of Children And Adolescents. Oxford University Press, 2006. ISBN 978-0-19-514584-7.
- Gerald P. Koocher and Patricia Keith-Spiegel. Ethics in Psychology and the Mental Health Professions: Professional Standards and Cases. Oxford University Press, 2008. ISBN 978-0-19-509201-1
- Kenneth S. Pope, Janet L. Sonne, Beverly Greene and Gerald P. Koocher. What Therapists Do Not Talk About and Why: Understanding Taboos That Hurt Us and Our Clients. American Psychological Association, 2006. ISBN 978-1-59147-411-1.
- Koocher, G. P. & La Greca, A. M. (Eds.) (2011) Emotional First Aid for Parents: Helping children and adolescents cope with predictable life crises. New York: Oxford University Press.
- Gerald P. Koocher, John C. Norcross and Beverly A. Greene (Eds.). Psychologists' Desk Reference, 3rd Edition. Oxford University Press, 2013. ISBN 978-0-19-984549-1.
- Gerald P. Koocher and Patricia Keith-Spiegel. Ethics in Psychology and the Mental Health Professions: Professional Standards and Cases, 4th Edition'. Oxford University Press, 2016. ISBN 978-0-19-509201-1

== Report ==
Koocher among other psychologists was named in an APA investigation into psychologists' involvement in interrogation at Guantanamo Bay, Cuba.
