= Ronald Fox =

Ronald Fox may refer to:

- Ronald Fox (cricketer), New Zealand cricketer and British army officer
- Ronald E. Fox, former president of the American Psychological Association
