= Division of Psychotherapy =

Division of the American Psychological Association

The Society for the Advancement of Psychotherapy (SAP) is Division 29 of the American Psychological Association (APA). It is a professional association dedicated to enhancing the practice, research, and education of psychotherapy.

== History and mission ==
The Society was founded in 1967. Key early milestones that led to the founding of the Society include:

- 1960: A group of psychologists organized Psychologists Interested in the Advancement of Psychotherapy (PIAP) at the APA annual meeting. PIAP aimed to unite practitioners and researchers devoted to improving psychotherapy.
- 1963: PIAP formally joined APA’s Division 12 (Clinical Psychology) as “Section II,” solidifying its status within APA. That same year, the group launched the journal Psychotherapy: Theory, Research, and Practice.
- September 4, 1967: APA Council approved the creation of Division 29 (Psychotherapy) as a standalone division. PIAP split from Division 12 to become this new division, officially establishing the Society for the Advancement of Psychotherapy within APA.

The SAP mission is to "promote mental health and well-being by supporting the professional development of psychotherapists and advancing the science of psychotherapy."

== Membership ==
SAP comprises a diverse group of professionals interested in the consultative process, including applied activities, research and evaluation, and education and training. Membership is open to students, international members, and allied professions. The society offers pathways for students and early career professionals to connect with the division and advance their careers through grants, awards, committees, and mentoring programs.

== Activities and publications ==
One of SAP's stated priorities is "dedicated to generating, sharing, and disseminating cutting-edge psychotherapy research." The society supports its flagship journal, Psychotherapy, and publishes a quarterly Bulletin with peer-review papers. SAP provides ongoing training and educational opportunities for psychologists and psychotherapists. Additionally, SAP hosts conferences and offers programming at the annual APA convention, focusing on various aspects of psychotherapy practice and research.

== Presidents ==
As of February 2025, the president is Stewart E. Cooper. Recent past presidents include:

- 2024: Tony Rousmaniere
- 2021-2023: Clara Hill
- 2020: Jennifer Callahan
- 2019: Nancy Murdock
- 2018: Michael J. Constantino
