= Barry S. Anton =

American psychologist

- Education: University of Vermont
- Occupation: Psychologist

Barry S. Anton is an American psychologist. He is a Distinguished Professor Emeritus at the University of Puget Sound where he taught for 34 years. Anton founded Rainier Behavioral Health, a multi-discipline mental health practice where he practices clinical child and adolescent psychology and neuropsychology. Anton has co-authored, along with Professor Janet Matthews, a clinical psychology textbook (Oxford University Press), published over 90 articles, and has presented numerous conference workshops, invited addresses, keynote addresses, and panel discussions nationally and internationally. Anton served as the president of the American Psychological Association (APA) in 2015.

== Biography ==
Anton earned an undergraduate degree from the University of Vermont and a Ph.D. from Colorado State University before completing postgraduate training in child and adolescent clinical psychology and neuropsychology at Harvard Medical School. He is a distinguished professor emeritus at the University of Puget Sound. He spent more than 30 years associated with the University of Puget Sound.

In 1985, Anton founded a private mental health practice in conjunction with a psychiatrist, Rainier Behavioral Health, and the practice expanded to include nurse practitioners, psychologists, mental health counselors and social workers. The practice was sold to LifeStance Health in 2020. Anton was the co-author of a textbook, Introduction to Clinical Psychology. He has been an oral examiner for the American Board of Professional Psychology. as well as a member of their Board of Directors (2012-2017). He is on the Advisory Committee for an American Epilepsy Society CDC funded grant (2022-2025).

In 1997, Anton received the Karl F. Heiser APA Presidential Award for Advocacy from APA Division 31 (State, Provincial & Territorial Affairs). He also received the State Leadership Award from the APA Practice Directorate in 2001. He is a Fellow of seven APA Divisions. After serving on six APA task forces, the Board of Directors as a Member at Large, and then two terms as Recording Secretary, Anton was elected president-elect in 2014 and served as APA president in 2015. Anton said that a focus of his presidency would be future opportunities for early-career psychologists. During his term as president, APA supported policies that prohibited psychologists from participating in national security interrogations.

Anton is a member of the Board of Directors of the Museum of Glass in Tacoma, Washington.
