= Jessica Henderson Daniel =

American psychologist

- Occupations: Professor and Director of Training in Psychology
- Awards: Harvard Medical School Excellence in Mentoring Award (1998); APA Award for Outstanding Lifetime Contributions (2021)

Academic background
- Education: Fayetteville State College; University of Illinois Urbana-Champaign

Jessica Henderson Daniel is a psychologist and educator, known for her work on mental health in the Black community, racial trauma, and the effects of stress and violence on Black children and adolescents. Daniel was the first African American woman to lead the American Psychological Association (APA), serving her term as president of the organization in 2018.

She was a member of the faculty at Harvard Medical School and served as Director of Training in Psychology at Boston Children's Hospital.

== Awards ==
Daniel was the first person of color, woman, and psychologist to win Harvard Medical School's A. Clifford Barger Excellence in Mentoring Award (1998). In 2021, she received the American Psychological Association Award for Outstanding Lifetime Contributions.

Other honors include the American Psychological Association of Graduate Students (APAGS) Kenneth and Mamie Clark Award (1999), the University of Illinois Distinguished Alumni Award (2001), the APA Distinguished Contributions to Education and Training Award (2002), the APA Committee on Women in Psychology, Distinguished Leader for Women in Psychology Award (2008), the Elizabeth Hurlock Beckman Trust Award (2012), and the APA Division 45 Asunción Miteria Austria and John Robinson Distinguished Mentoring Award (2014).

The Society for the Psychology of Women (APA Division 35) gives the Strickland-Daniel Mentoring Award annually to a distinguished feminist mentor, in honor of the distinguished mentoring of Bonnie Ruth Strickland and Jessica Henderson Daniel.

== Biography ==
Daniel was born in San Antonio, TX. As the daughter of an Air Force crew chief and an NAACP chapter founder, her family moved frequently, which gave her the chance to learn about various cultures.

Daniel studied at Fayetteville State College (now Fayetteville State University) where she received a B.A. in History, summa cum laude graduation in 1964. She attended University of Illinois Urbana-Champaign and completed a master's degree in 1967 and a PhD in 1969 in Education, under the supervision of Ray H. Simpson. Her dissertation research was conducted in the context of the desegregation and the Black power movements, and examined factors associated with Black graduate students' decisions to obtain employment in what was then viewed as Black versus White work settings. Daniel joined the faculty of Harvard Medical School in 1970 as a mentor to students of color, and remained there throughout her career.

== Representative publications ==
- Daniel, Jessica Henderson (1980). "Black Graduate Students' Choice of Future Work Settings". The Journal of Negro Education. 49 (1): 77–84. doi:10.2307/2294786. JSTOR 2294786.
- Daniel, J. H. (2000). The courage to hear: African American women's memories of racial trauma. In L. C. Jackson & B. Greene (Eds.), Psychotherapy with African American women: Innovations in psychodynamic perspective and practice. The Guilford Press.
- Daniel, Jessica Henderson (June 2009). "Next generation: A mentoring program for black female psychologists". Professional Psychology: Research and Practice. 40 (3): 299–305. doi:10.1037/a0013891. ProQuest 614503430.
- Daniel, Jessica Henderson; Roysircar, Gargi; Abeles, Norman; Boyd, Cyndy (July 2004). "Individual and cultural-diversity competency: Focus on the therapist". Journal of Clinical Psychology. 60 (7): 755–770. doi:10.1002/jclp.20014. PMID 15195338. INIST 15894464.
- Jernigan, Maryam M.; Daniel, Jessica Henderson (June 2011). "Racial Trauma in the Lives of Black Children and Adolescents: Challenges and Clinical Implications". Journal of Child & Adolescent Trauma. 4 (2): 123–141. doi:10.1080/19361521.2011.574678. S2CID 145288431.
