= Jack Wiggins Jr. =

American psychologist (born 1926)

- Born: January 1, 1926 (age 100); Little Rock, Arkansas, U.S.
- Education: University of Oklahoma; Southern Methodist University; Purdue University
- Known for: Past president, American Psychological Association
- Scientific career
- Fields: Psychology

Jack Gillmore Wiggins Jr. (born January 1, 1926) is an American psychologist and a past president of the American Psychological Association (APA).

== Biography ==
Wiggins earned an undergraduate psychology degree from the University of Oklahoma in 1948. He completed a master's degree from Southern Methodist University and a Ph.D. from Purdue University.

Serving as the 1992 APA president, Wiggins was the second of five APA presidents elected between 1990 and 2000 who publicly advocated for prescriptive privileges for psychologists.

Wiggins is a board member emeritus of The Academy of Medical Psychology. He was editor of the Archives of Medical Psychology. In 2005, Wiggins was recognised by APA president Ronald F. Levant for his efforts in advocating for prescriptive privileges for psychologists. The next year, he was honoured with a lifetime achievement award from The American Psychological Foundation.
