= Division of Exercise and Sport Psychology =

- Formation: 1986
- Headquarters: Washington, D.C.
- President: Amanda J. Visek
- Website: www.apadivisions.org/division-47/

The Division of Exercise and Sport Psychology is an academic and professional society in the United States that represents interdisciplinary specialization that cuts across psychology and the sport sciences.

The Division serves as Division 47 of the American Psychological Association. This organization emphasizes both research and practice in sport and exercise psychology.

== Journals ==
- Sport, Exercise, and Performance Psychology (2012–)

== Division 47 presidents ==
- 1987–1989: William P. Morgan
- 1990–1991: Daniel Landers
- 1992–1993: Steven R. Heyman
- 1994–1995: Daniel S. Kirschenbaum
- 1996–1997: Robert N. Singer
- 1998–1999: Shane M. Murphy
- 2000–2001: Diane L. Gill
- 2002–2003: Kate F. Hays
- 2004: Judy van Raalte
- 2005: Frank M. Webbe
- 2006: Penny McCullagh
- 2007: Kirsten M. Peterson
- 2008: Christopher M. Carr
- 2009: Ed O. Acevedo
- 2010: Michael L. Sachs
- 2011: Jennifer Carter
- 2012: Gloria Balague
- 2013: Trent Petrie
- 2014: Christine Selby
- 2015: John Heil
- 2016: Anthony Kontos
- 2017: Vincent Granito
- 2018: Courney Albinson

== See also ==
- Sport psychology
