= Thema Bryant =

American psychologist and academic

The Reverend Thema Bryant
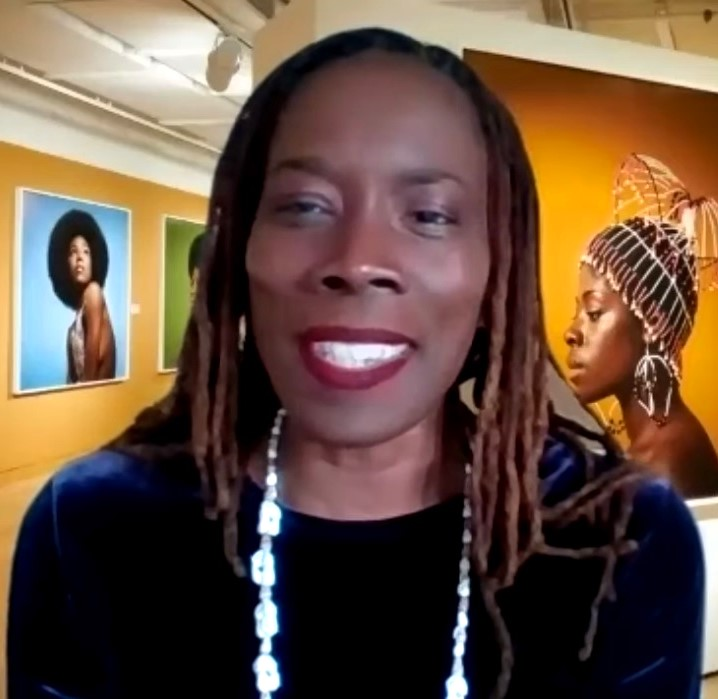
- Bryant-Davis in 2021
- Born: Thema Simone Bryant; 1973 (age 52–53)
- Other name: Thema Bryant-Davis
- Education: Duke University
- Scientific career
- Workplaces: Pepperdine University; Harvard Medical School; Princeton University; California State University, Long Beach
- Thesis: The path to wholeness : effective coping strategies of African-American adult survivors of childhood violent experiences (1999)

Thema Simone Bryant, also known as Thema Bryant-Davis (born 1973), is a Liberian psychologist who is a professor of psychology at the Pepperdine University, where she directs the Culture and Trauma Research Laboratory. Her research considers interpersonal trauma and societal trauma of oppression. She was elected as the 2023 President of the American Psychological Association.

== Early life and education ==
Bryant is the daughter of two pastors. Throughout her childhood, she saw people from her community seeking out her father for counselling. As an adolescent, she was evacuated from Liberia during the civil war and moved to Baltimore. She completed her doctorate in clinical psychology at Duke University. Her doctoral research looked at coping strategies of African American survivors of childhood violence. She moved to Harvard Medical School as a postdoctoral researcher, where she worked with the Victims of Violence Program. Bryant then joined the Princeton University SHARE Program, where she coordinated initiatives to combat sexual assault and harassment. During her three years as SHARE coordinator, she helped train staff on culturally appropriate interventions and LGBT-related prejudice.

== Research and career ==
In 2005, Bryant moved to California State University, Long Beach. She stayed there for two years, until she was appointed Professor of Psychology at Pepperdine University in 2007. Her research considers the societal trauma of oppression and interpersonal trauma.

Bryant is the host of "Homecoming", a mental health podcast. She was elected President of the American Psychological Association in 2023.

== Awards and honors ==
- 2013 American Psychological Association Distinguished Early Career Contributions to Psychology in the Public Interest
- 2016 Institute of Violence, Abuse and Trauma Media Award for the film “Psychology of Human Trafficking”
- 2016 Donald Fridley Memorial Award for excellence in mentoring in the field of trauma
- 2018 The California Psychological Association Distinguished Scientific Achievement in Psychology

== Academic service ==
Bryant was President of the Society for the Psychology of Women, a division of the American Psychological Association. She represented the APA at the United Nations. She gave evidence at the United Nations World Conference Against Racism, Racial Discrimination, Xenophobia and Related Intolerance in 2001.

== Personal life ==
Bryant is an ordained minister in the African Methodist Episcopal Church.

== Selected publications ==
- Thema Bryant-Davis; Heewoon Chung; Shaquita Tillman; Annie Belcourt (July 2, 2009). "From the margins to the center: ethnic minority women and the mental health effects of sexual assault". Trauma. 10 (4): 330–357. doi:10.1177/1524838009339755. ISSN 1524-8380. PMID 19578029. Wikidata Q37541527.
- Thema Bryant-Davis (September 1, 2019). "The cultural context of trauma recovery: Considering the posttraumatic stress disorder practice guideline and intersectionality". Psychotherapy. 56 (3): 400–408. doi:10.1037/pst0000241. ISSN 0033-3204. PMID 31282715. Wikidata Q91699793.
- Thema Bryant-Davis; Sarah E Ullman; Yuying Tsong; Robyn Gobin (December 1, 2011). "Surviving the storm: the role of social support and religious coping in sexual assault recovery of African American women". Violence Against Women. 17 (12): 1601–1618. doi:10.1177/1077801211436138. ISSN 1077-8012. PMC 3844285. PMID 22410773. Wikidata Q37351667.
- Homecoming: Overcome Fear and Trauma to Reclaim Your Whole Authentic Self and co-author of The Antiracism Handbook: Practical Tools to Shift Your Mindset & Uproot Racism in Your Life and Community
