= Frank C. Worrell =

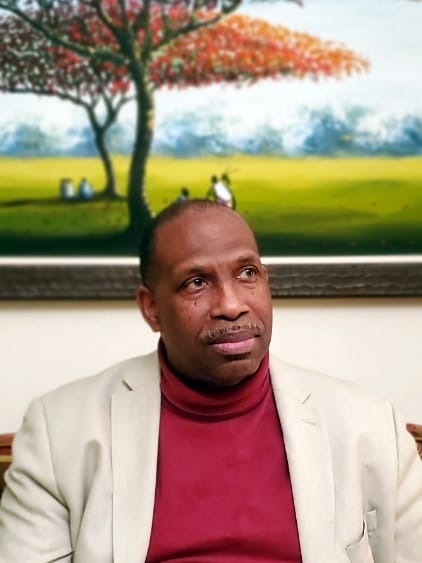
- Born: Port-of-Spain, Trinidad and Tobago
- Occupations: Distinguished Professor at the Berkeley School of Education; 2022 President of the American Psychological Association

Academic background
- Education: University of Western Ontario (B.A.); University of Western Ontario (M.A.); University of California, Berkeley (Ph.D..)

Academic work
- Discipline: Educational Psychology
- Institutions: University of California, Berkeley; Heidelberg University

Frank C. Worrell is a psychologist and academic. He is a distinguished professor at the University of California, Berkeley and a professor at Heidelberg University. He was the 2022 president of the American Psychological Association.

Worrell's research examines academic talent development, gifted education, at-risk youth, cultural and ethnic identity, school culture, teaching effectiveness, and the application of psychological research to educational practice. He is a fellow of the American Educational Research Association, the Association for Psychological Science, and six divisions of the American Psychological Association. Moreover, he is an elected member of the National Academy of Education.

== Education ==
Worrell earned a B.A. in Psychology from the University of Western Ontario in 1985 and an M.A. in Psychology from the same institution in 1987. In 1994, he completed a Ph.D. in Educational and School Psychology at the University of California, Berkeley.

== Career ==
Worrell started his career at Pennsylvania State University, where he served as assistant professor from 1994 to 2000 and associate professor from 2000 to 2003. He then joined the University of California, Berkeley as an associate professor in 2002 and was promoted to professor in 2007, a position he held until 2020. Since 2020, he has been a distinguished professor in the School Psychology Program at Berkeley. At Berkeley, Worell has been the director of the School Psychology Program and faculty director of the Academic Talent Development Program since 2004, associate dean for Academic Affairs in the School of Education from 2008 to 2011, and faculty director of the California Preparatory Academy since 2012. Since 2023, he has also served as a professor at Heidelberg University and has been a member of its Academic Advisory Council since 2024.

Between 1998 and 2002, Worrell served as a school psychology consultant to the Central Guidance Unit of the Ministry of Education in Trinidad and Tobago, where, as lead consultant, he coordinated a national norming project from 2001 to 2002. He also worked as a consultant to the School Leadership Center of Trinidad and Tobago. In 2022, he was elected president of the American Psychological Association.

== Research ==
Worrell's research centers on understanding giftedness, talent development, and the psychological factors that influence achievement across diverse groups. He conceptualized giftedness as superior performance in one or more domains and emphasized that a multiplicity of factors shapes talent differences and long-term development. In collaboration with Rena F. Subotnik and Paula Olszewski-Kubilius, Worrell co-developed the talent development megamodel, which integrates concepts of giftedness, talent, creativity, expertise, and eminence into a unified framework. The model highlights the developmental nature of talent growth, emphasizing the roles of psychosocial factors, opportunity, and high-quality training in fostering exceptional achievement.

Worrell's work underscores that giftedness is a lifelong, dynamic process shaped by both cognitive and socio-emotional development. He identified psychosocial skills such as self-efficacy, resilience, goal setting, and motivation as essential for sustaining excellence, emphasizing the need for structured educational practices like acceleration and enrichment to nurture these abilities.

Worrell has also examined cultural identities among students from diverse ethnic backgrounds, finding that a positive sense of ethnic identity is linked to both emotional well-being and academic success. In related work, he co-authored the Cross Racial Identity Scale (CRIS) and the Cross Ethnic-Racial Identity Scale (CERIS), which measure identity attitudes across Black and other ethnically diverse populations. In addition, Worrell contributed to research on time perspective, co-authoring the Adolescent and Adult Time Inventory and evaluating tools such as the Zimbardo Time Perspective Inventory to better understand how time attitudes relate to behavior across cultures.

== Works ==
Worrell has published books on motivation, gifted education, and academic development. He co-edited Achieving College Dreams: How a University-Charter District Partnership Created an Early College High School with Rhona S. Weinstein in 2016, examining the collaboration between a university and a charter district to create an early-college high school for first-generation students. Edward Seidman remarked that the volume "stands as an exemplar of program development, scientific knowledge, and clinical know-how," while also observing that its research depth may challenge general readers. Following this, in 2018, he co-edited Talent Development as a Framework for Gifted Education with Subotnik and Olszewski-Kubilius, which examined talent development as a framework for delivering gifted education services and was described as a "detailed discussion" of its application by Jennifer Richotte. Later, in 2019, he published The Psychology of High Performance: Developing Human Potential into Domain-specific Talent with Subotnik and Olszewski-Kubilius, exploring how potential develops into high achievement across domains such as sports, academics, and the arts. He also collaborated with Tammy L. Hughes and Dante D. Dixson for The Cambridge Handbook of Applied School Psychology, where they analyzed the role of school psychology in supporting students' learning, behavior, and well-being while addressing inequities in education.Moreover, his 2024 book, Motivation Myth Busters: Science-Based Strategies to Boost Motivation in Yourself and Others, co-authored with Wendy S. Grolnick and Benjamin C. Heddy, addressed common misconceptions about motivation and presented research-based strategies for effective motivation. Emily Polacek regarded the work as "well-written" and "easy to understand".

== Awards and honors ==
- 2007 – Fellow, American Psychological Association
- 2009 – Presidential Award, National Association of School Psychologists
- 2011 – Fellow, Association for Psychological Science
- 2013 – Jack Bardon Distinguished Service Award, Division 16, APA
- 2013 – Distinguished Scholar Award, National Association for Gifted Children
- 2015 – Fellow, American Educational Research Association
- 2016 – Nadine Lambert Outstanding School Psychologist Award, California Association of School Psychologists
- 2018 – Member, National Academy of Education
- 2023 – Honorary Doctorate, Heidelberg University
- 2024 – The Marsilius Medal, Heidelberg University
- 2024 – Nadine Murphy Lambert Lifetime Achievement Award, Division 16, APA
- 2024 – Lifetime Achievement Award, Mensa Education and Research Foundation
- 2025 – Tom Oakland Outstanding International Scholar Award, International School Psychology Association

== Bibliography ==
=== Books ===
- Weinstein, Rhona S.; Worrell, Frank C. (2016). Achieving College Dreams: How a University-Charter District Partnership Created an Early College High School. Oxford University Press. ISBN 9780190260903.
- Subotnik, Rena Faye; Olszewski-Kubilius, Paula; Worrell, Frank C., eds. (2019). The Psychology of High Performance: Developing Human Potential into Domain-specific Talent. American Psychological Association. ISBN 9781433829888.
- Worrell, Frank C.; Hughes, Tammy L.; Dixson, Dante D., eds. (2020). The Cambridge Handbook of Applied School Psychology. Cambridge University Press. ISBN 9781108235532.
- Olszewski-Kubilius, Paula; Subotnik, Rena Faye; Worrell, Frank C. (2021). Talent Development as a Framework for Gifted Education: Implications for Best Practices and Applications in Schools. Routledge. ISBN 9781000503777.
- Grolnick, Wendy S.; Heddy, Benjamin C.; Worrell, Frank C. (2024). Motivation Myth Busters: Science-Based Strategies to Boost Motivation in Yourself and Others. APA LifeTools. ISBN 9781433841675.

=== Selected articles ===
- Vandiver, B. J.; Fhagen-Smith, Peony E.; Cokley, Kevin O.; Cross Jr., W. E.; Worrell, F. C. (2001). "Cross's Nigrescence Model: From Theory to Scale to Theory". Journal of Multicultural Counseling and Development. 29 (3): 174–200. doi:10.1002/j.2161-1912.2001.tb00516.x.
- Vandiver, B. J.; Cross, W. E., Jr.; Worrell, F. C.; Fhagen-Smith, P. E. (2002). "Validating the Cross Racial Identity Scale". Journal of Counseling Psychology. 49 (1): 71–85. doi:10.1037/0022-0167.49.1.71.
- Subotnik, R. F; Olszewski-Kubilius, P.; Worrell, F. C (2011). "Rethinking Giftedness and Gifted Education: A Proposed Direction Forward Based on Psychological Science". Psychological Science in the Public Interest. 12 (1): 3–54. doi:10.1177/1529100611418056. PMID 26168418.
- Mello, Z. R.; Worrell, F. C. (2014). "The Past, the Present, and the Future: A Conceptual Model of Time Perspective in Adolescence". Time Perspective Theory; Review, Research and Application. pp. 115–129. doi:10.1007/978-3-319-07368-2_7. ISBN 978-3-319-07367-5.
- Dixson, D. D.; Worrell, F. C. (2016). "Formative and Summative Assessment in the Classroom". Theory into Practice. 55 (2): 153–159. doi:10.1080/00405841.2016.1148989.
- Froiland, J. M.; Worrell, F. C. (2016). "Intrinsic Motivation, Learning Goals, Engagement, and Achievement in a Diverse High School". Psychology in the Schools. 53 (3): 321–336. doi:10.1002/pits.21901.
- Worrell, F. C.; Subotnik, R. F.; Olszewski-Kubilius, Paula (2022). "Giftedness and eminence: Clarifying the relationship". Gifted and Talented International. 36 (1–2): 3–14. doi:10.1080/15332276.2022.2049461.
- Worrell, F. C.; Vandiver, B. J.; Fhagen, Peony E. (2023). "Nigrescence theory from 1971 to 2021: The critical contributions of William E. Cross, Jr". American Psychologist. 78 (4): 389–400. doi:10.1037/amp0001052. PMID 37384495.
