= CASP (disambiguation) =

CASP is the Critical Assessment of Structure Prediction, a worldwide experiment for protein structure prediction

CASP may also refer to:

- California Association of School Psychologists
- Central aortic pressure, the blood pressure at the root of aorta, sometimes called "CASP"
- Advanced Security Practitioner certification from CompTIA
- Crypto Asset Service Provider, a legal entity that provides crypto-asset services in accordance with the European Markets in Crypto-Assets Regulation (MiCAR).
