= Susan H. McDaniel =

American psychologist

Susan H. McDaniel is an American psychologist and the Dr. Laurie Sands Distinguished Professor of Families & Health at the University of Rochester School of Medicine and Dentistry. She was the 2016 president of the American Psychological Association (APA).

== Biography ==
McDaniel was raised in the American South, where her father was a physician and her mother was a homemaker. She attended college at Duke University. She earned a Ph.D. in clinical psychology from the University of North Carolina at Chapel Hill in 1979. McDaniel completed her internship at the University of Texas Medical Branch and completed postdoctoral training at the Texas Research Institute for Mental Sciences.

At the University of Rochester, McDaniel is the Dr. Laurie Sands Distinguished Professor of Families and Health for the Department of Psychiatry. She also directs the University of Rochester Medical Center (URMC) Patient- and Family-Centered Care Coaching Program and is associate chair of the family medicine department at URMC. McDaniel has received awards related to teaching, including a 2011 Elizabeth Hurlock Beckman Award and the inaugural Cummings PSYCHE Prize from the American Psychological Foundation in 2007.

During her campaign for APA president, McDaniel established two priorities for her term: preparing psychologists as leaders and integrating psychology into provision of other types of health care.
