= Carol D. Goodheart =

American psychologist

- Education: Rutgers University
- Scientific career
- Fields: Psychology
- Workplaces: American Psychological Association; Rutgers University

Carol D. Goodheart is an American psychologist and a past president of the American Psychological Association (APA). Goodheart worked as a nurse before entering psychology. She completed a doctorate in counseling psychology from Rutgers University. While serving as the 2010 APA president, Goodheart supported the Presidential Task Force on Advancing Practice and the Presidential Task Force on Caregivers. Goodheart is in private practice in Princeton, New Jersey.

== Biography ==
=== Career ===
Goodheart received a nursing diploma from the St. Luke's Hospital School of Nursing in New York. Between 1961 and 1968, Goodheart worked as a nurse in several states; her practice settings included emergency care, intensive care and two Native American reservations. She received her psychology education at Rutgers University, earning an undergraduate degree in 1972 and a doctor of education in counseling psychology in 1978. She received postdoctoral training from the National Psychological Association for Psychoanalysis.

Goodheart spent several years on the APA Board of Directors and served as the organization's treasurer. She co-chaired the APA Presidential Task Force on the Future of Psychology Practice and chaired the Task Force on Evidence-Based Practice. She has served as a senior adviser to the Advisory Council on Genetics and was president of the APA's largest division (Psychologists in Independent Practice).

Goodheart was elected president of the APA for 2010 and focused on integrating science and practice. She supported two APA task forces during her term in office: the Presidential Task Force on Advancing Practice and the Presidential Task Force on Caregivers. During her presidency, the organization was active in gay rights issues. The Council of Representatives voted that April to move its meeting out of the Manchester Grand Hyatt Hotel after its owner made a donation to the California Proposition 8 campaign. After an August district court ruling struck down Proposition 8, Goodheart said, "The American Psychological Association is gratified that the court agreed that there is no justification for denying marriage equality to same-sex couples."

Goodheart has a counseling psychology private practice in Princeton, New Jersey, where she has a special interest in clients with physical disabilities and medical conditions. Goodheart has helped to found a multispecialty mental health practice and a company that develops materials promoting health and quality of life among women. She has served in multiple graduate faculty roles for Rutgers University.

=== Honors and awards ===
- Distinguished Psychologist Award for Lifetime Contributions, APA Division 29 (Psychotherapy), 2007
- APA Presidential Citation, 2005
- Distinguished Psychologist of the Year, APA Division 42 (Psychologists in Independent Practice), 2002
- Psychologist of the Year, New Jersey Psychological Association, 1991

=== Personal ===
Goodheart and her daughter Leigh Woznick wrote Living with Childhood Cancer: A Practical Guide to Help Families Cope. They wrote the book after Goodheart's granddaughter survived cancer that had been diagnosed at nine months of age.

== Selected works ==
=== Books ===
- Goodheart, C. D., Kazdin, A. E. and Sternberg, R. J. Evidence-Based Psychotherapy: Where Research and Practice Meet, American Psychological Association, 2006.
- Worell, J. and Goodheart, C. D. Handbook of Girls' and Women's Psychological Health (Oxford Series in Clinical Psychology), Oxford University Press, 2005.
- Woznick, L. A. and Goodheart, C. D. Living with Childhood Cancer: A Practical Guide to Help Families Cope, American Psychological Association, 2002.
- Goodheart, C. D. and Lansing, M. H. Treating People with Chronic Disease: A Psychological Guide, American Psychological Association, 1997.
