= Theodore H. Blau =

American psychologist

Theodore H. Blau (March 3, 1928 – January 28, 2003) was a noted clinical, police and forensic psychologist who was the first clinician in independent practice to be elected president of the American Psychological Association in 1977. He was a prolific writer and wrote, among other books and articles, a well known book on Forensic psychology.

== History ==
Blau earned his bachelor's, master's and Ph.D. degrees from Pennsylvania State University and completed his residency at the Veterans Administration hospital in Perry Point, Maryland. He was an early adherent to B. F. Skinner and Kenneth B. Clark. After moving to Tampa, Florida in 1955, he developed a successful private clinical practice, specializing in child psychology, cognitive psychology, and behavior modification. Blau became prominent over the next 30 years in academic and clinical psychology. He later specialized in forensic psychology but never gave up his clinical practice and wrote technical books in the field.

The Theodore H. Blau Early Career Award for Outstanding Contribution to Professional Clinical Psychology is an annual award bestowed in his honor by the American Psychological Association, Division 12, The Society of Clinical Psychology: "The Theodore H. Blau Early Career Award for Outstanding Contribution to Professional Clinical Psychology will be given by the Division of Clinical Psychology to a Clinical Psychologist who has made an outstanding contribution to the profession of Clinical Psychology."

A key tobacco industry witness, Blau testified in both the Galbraith and the Cipollone trials according to a defense pattern that continues in 21st century trials. Specifically, to downplay the difficulty of quitting and the importance of nicotine and other ingredients, while shifting the responsibility to the smoker with the implication that the smoker's motivation to quit is the main factor.

== Selected works ==
- Blau T.H. (1950). Report on a method of predicting success in psychotherapy. Journal of Clinical Psychology, 6 (4), 403–406.
- Blau, T.H. (1969). The professional in the community views the nonprofessional helper:. In Grosser, Cl, Henry, W.E. & Kelly, J.E. (Eds.), Nonprofessionals in the Suman Services. San Francisco: Jossey-Bass.
- Blau, T.H. (1984). Foreword in Kaslow, F. (Ed.) Psychotherapy with Psychotherapists. New York: John Wiley & Sons.
