= Nadine Kaslow =

American psychologist

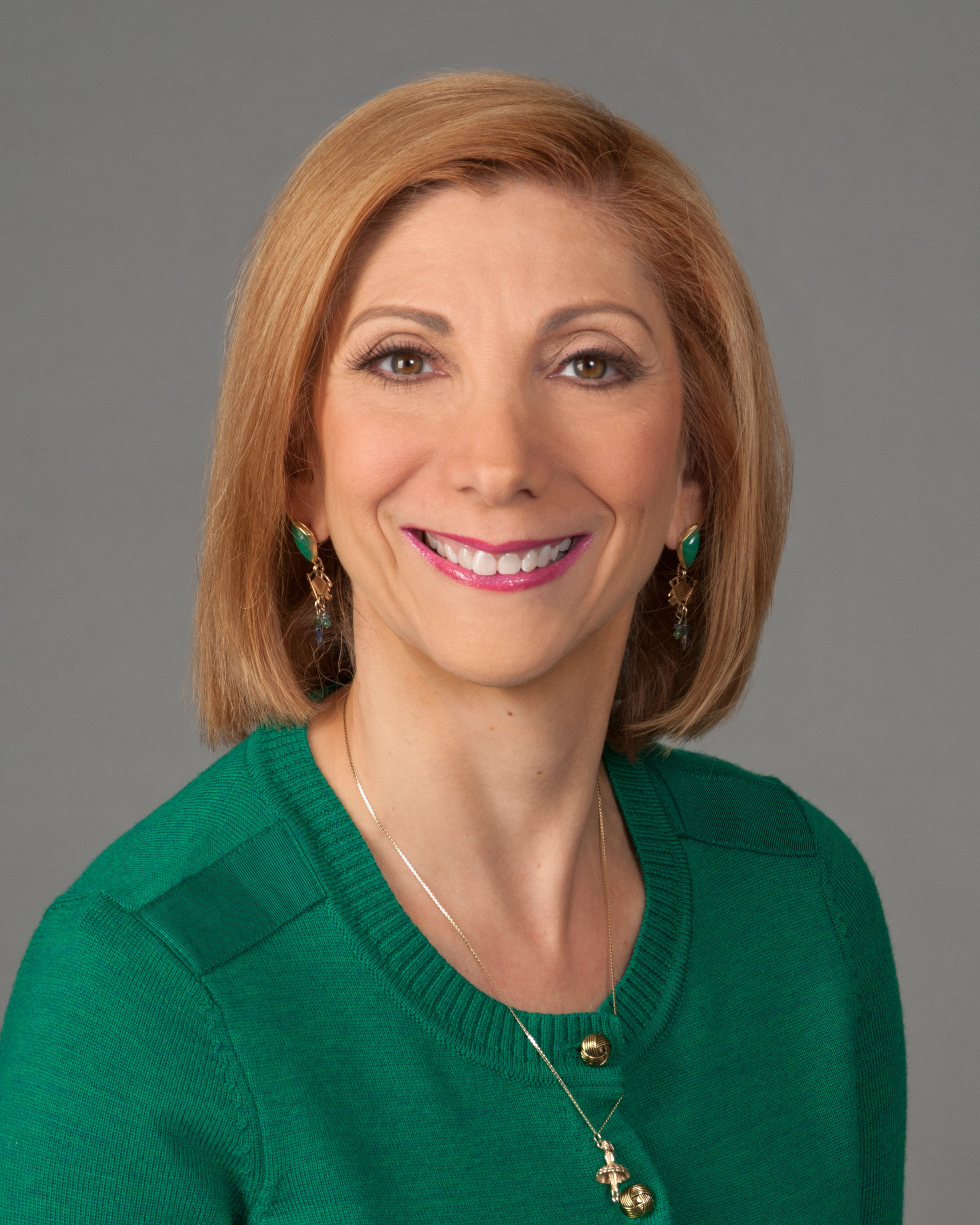
- Education: University of Pennsylvania; University of Houston
- Known for: President, American Psychological Association (2014)
- Scientific career
- Fields: Psychology
- Workplaces: Emory University; Grady Health System

Nadine J. Kaslow is an American psychologist, the 2014 president of the American Psychological Association (APA) and the editor of the Journal of Family Psychology. Before her current affiliation with Emory University, Kaslow worked at Yale University. She was recipient of the 2004 American Psychological Association award for Distinguished Contributions to Education and Training in Psychology.

== Biography ==
Growing up near Philadelphia, Kaslow was the daughter of psychologist Florence Kaslow. Kaslow studied dance when she was young and belonged to the Pennsylvania Ballet in high school and part of college. She attended the University of Pennsylvania and completed a PhD in psychology at the University of Houston. She nearly joined the Houston Ballet while she was in graduate school, but she decided that she would have had to lose an unhealthy amount of weight to do so. She currently serves as the Psychologist for the Atlanta Ballet Company and is frequently interviewed for the major dance magazines.

After completing a doctoral internship and postgraduate training at the University of Wisconsin, Kaslow worked at Yale University before moving to Emory University in 1990. She is a Professor and Vice Chair for Faculty Development in the Emory University School of Medicine Department of Psychiatry and Behavioral Sciences Emory University, in private practice at the Emory Clinic, is the chief psychologist for the Grady Health System and is the psychologist for the Atlanta Ballet. She is board certified through the American Board of Professional Psychology in clinical psychology, clinical child and adolescent psychology, and couple and family psychology. She is a former editor of the Journal of Family Psychology. One of Kaslow's key accomplishments was founding the Nia Project. This program began in the early 1990s and has impacted the lives of over 2,000 women. The Grady Nia Project is a program in suicide and domestic violence prevention for African-American women. The program aims to empower women to access behavioral health services, find a new sense of purpose, lead more meaningful lives, and affirm their commitment to living a violence-free life. The Nia Project now falls under the larger rubric of the Atlanta Trauma Alliance, which Kaslow also directs.

Prior to becoming president of the APA, Kaslow chaired the Association of Psychology Postdoctoral and Internship Centers from 1998 to 2002 and now is a board member emeritus of that organization. In 2002, she chaired the multinational 2002 Competencies Conference: Future Directions in Education and Credentialing in Professional Psychology. After serving as president of the American Board of Clinical Psychology, she was President of the American Board of Professional Psychology in 2010 and 2011. She also served as the President of Family Process Institute and the Wynne Center for Family Research. Kaslow was a fellow in the 2003-2004 Class of the Executive Leadership in Academic Medicine (ELAM) Program for Women, a fellow in the 2004 Woodruff Leadership Academy, and a Primary Care Public Policy fellow through the United States Public Health Service - Department of Health and Human Services.

Kaslow has been very active in the APA, serving on the APA Board of Educational Affairs and Board of Professional Affairs and the Policy and Planning Board. She has also been president of four APA divisions, 12 (clinical), 18 (public service), 29 (psychotherapy), and 43 (couple and family psychology). . She was elected to serve a term as president-elect of the APA for 2013 followed by a term as president in 2014. Her presidential initiatives included work with healthcare reform with a focus on psychologists roles in Patient Centered Medical Homes; improving the pipeline in psychology from doctoral degree to first job; and translating psychological science to the public. She also focused on integrating arts and psychology.

Kaslow has received over 20 years of funding from the National Institutes of Health, Centers for Disease Control and Prevention, and Substance Abuse and Mental Health Services Administration for her research.

Her primary areas of research focus include: child and adolescent psychopathology, with particular attention to the assessment and treatment of depressed, suicidal, and medically ill (e.g., sickle cell disease) youth and their families; women's mental health, with attention paid to depression, suicidal behavior, and the link between domestic violence and suicidal behavior in African American women; family violence, notably childhood maltreatment and domestic violence; and psychology education and training.
