= Max Siegel (psychologist) =

American psychologist

- Born: July 22, 1918; New York City
- Died: January 1, 1988 (aged 69); Boca Raton, Florida
- Scientific career
- Fields: Psychology
- Workplaces: Brooklyn College

Max Siegel (July 22, 1918 – January 1, 1988) was an American psychologist and past president of the American Psychological Association (APA). His faculty appointments included work at Brooklyn College, Florida Atlantic University and Nova Southeastern University. Siegel was interested in issues surrounding crime.

== Early life ==
Siegel was born in New York City. He studied psychology at City College of New York, where he earned undergraduate and master's degrees in psychology. He earned a PhD from New York University and then studied under psychoanalyst Erich Fromm.

== Career ==
Siegel established a mental health clinic at Brooklyn College for military veterans after World War II. Siegel had a private psychotherapy practice in Brooklyn. He was a dean of students at Brooklyn College.

Siegel studied the insanity defense, patient confidentiality, and issues surrounding crime victims. In a 1982 interview, he said that he had a sister who was murdered in New York, and the killer was set free five months later, after a not guilty by reason of insanity plea. He felt that psychologists should be used only as agents of the court rather than working for one side in a trial or the other. "I'm totally against psychologists being used as a prosecution or a defense," he said.

In 1976, Siegel began flying from New York City to Boca Raton, Florida, once per week to teach a course at Florida Atlantic University. Three years later, Siegel moved to Boca Raton and entered semi-retirement, limiting his practice to two days per week. Siegel served on President Reagan's Task Force on Violent Crimes. In semi-retirement, Siegel continued to work for Nova Southeastern University and gave an occasional lecture at Florida Atlantic University.

== Later life ==
Siegel was president of the APA in 1983. During his tenure as president, he led the APA's purchase of the Psychology Today magazine. He referred to the publication as "Siegel's folly" when the magazine ran into financial problems.

Siegel died in a Boca Raton hospital in 1988 following a heart attack. He was survived by a wife and two children.
