= John J. Conger =

American psychologist

- Born: February 27, 1921
- Died: June 24, 2006 (aged 85); Denver, Colorado
- Known for: Past president, American Psychological Association
- Scientific career
- Fields: Psychology

John Janeway Conger (February 27, 1921 – June 24, 2006) was an American psychologist and a past president of the American Psychological Association (APA). He was the dean of the University of Colorado School of Medicine, and he advised five U.S. presidents on psychology-related matters.

== Biography ==
Conger was born on February 27, 1921. He was educated at Amherst College and Yale University. He served in World War II and commanded the USS Tweedy (DE-532).

Conger was associated with the University of Colorado School of Medicine for many years, including service as the medical school's dean. He was the first psychologist in the country to become a medical school dean. He also became known for his research into adolescent personality and psychopathology. The school awarded him a University Medal in 1986 and an honorary Doctor of Science in 1989.

In the 1950s, Conger wrote a textbook titled Child Development and Personality. Until his book was published, developmental psychology textbooks were usually organized by topic and not by developmental stage. Conger served as the child psychology expert on the Mental Health Commission established by President Carter, and Rosalynn Carter was said to have enjoyed conversations with him. Conger was appointed to presidential commissions under five administrations. He was the 1981 president of the APA. He was vice president of the MacArthur Foundation.

Conger died in Denver on June 24, 2006. He was survived by his wife, who he had married on January 1, 1944. The University of Colorado School of Medicine sponsors the John J. Conger, PhD Lectureship in Child Mental Health Policy Endowment.
