= Walter Samuel Hunter =

American psychologist (1889–1954)

- Born: Walter Samuel Hunter; March 22, 1889; Decatur, Illinois, U.S.
- Died: August 3, 1954 (aged 65)
- Education: University of Chicago; University of Texas; Preparatory School of the Polytechnic College
- Known for: American Psychological Association President, author of textbook General Psychology
- Spouse(s): Katherine Pratt and Alda Grace Barber
- Children: 2
- Awards: First G. Stanley Hall Professor of Genetic Psychology at Clark University, Chairman of the Department of Psychology at Brown University, The President’s Medal for Merit
- Scientific career
- Workplaces: Clark University, University of Kansas, Brown University
- Thesis: Delayed Reaction in Animals and Children

Walter Samuel Hunter (March 22, 1889 – August 3, 1954) contributed to psychology by leading an effort to develop psychology as a science. Hunter was one of the first scholars of the time to focus not on the study of subjective mental processes but rather on the observation of animal behavior. In 1912, Hunter completed his doctoral dissertation on Delayed Reaction in Animals and Children. He was a pioneer in the effort of scientific documentation, having created Psychological Abstracts in 1927, which contained documents from psychologists in the U.S. and abroad.

== Biography ==
Walter Samuel Hunter was born in Decatur, Illinois, on March 22, 1889. His mother died when he was 12 years old. After his mother's death, his father, George Hunter, moved him and his brother to Fort Worth, Texas. In January 1913, Hunter married his first wife, Katherine Pratt. The couple had a daughter named Thayer. Katherine Pratt died at the age of 27, shortly after the birth of their daughter. Hunter married his second wife, Alda Grace Barber, in 1917. His second daughter, Helen Barbara, was born in 1920. Hunter had a full career studying psychology before he died suddenly in 1954 from a coronary occlusion.

== Education ==
Hunter attended the Preparatory School of the Polytechnic College in 1905 where he was introduced to psychology by his roommate. He then attended the University of Texas, from which he graduated with a concentration in psychology in 1908. After graduation, he began graduate work at the University of Chicago, where he received a PhD. in psychology. Hunter returned to the University of Texas in 1912 as an instructor. In 1916, Hunter accepted a professorship of psychology at the University of Kansas. In 1925, Hunter accepted the position to become the first G. Stanley Hall Professor of Genetic Psychology at Clark University. In 1936, Hunter became the chairman of the Department of Psychology at Brown University.

== Accomplishments ==
During his time at the University of Kansas in 1919, he produced his first textbook, entitled General Psychology. While at Clark University, Hunter was the editor of the Psychological Index. He also wrote a second textbook entitled Human Behavior, established Psychological Abstracts, and served as president of the American Psychological Association from 1930 to 1931. During his time at Clark he also published 21 experimental papers, five theoretical studies, and four book chapters. While he was American Psychological Association President, he delivered an address on the Psychological Study of Behavior. In 1933, Hunter was elected to the American Academy of Arts and Sciences, and in 1935, he was elected to the National Academy of Sciences. In 1936, Hunter became the chairman of the Department of Psychology at Brown University. He was elected to the American Philosophical Society in 1941.

== Psychology and the military ==
Hunter served in the military for sixteen months during World War I. He was the chief psychological examiner in three army camps. During that time he compiled bar graphs with E.S. Jones that showed the predictive value of group psychological tests. His work persuaded government officials to continue the testing program, which ultimately led military officials to order the recording of data on the national origins of the troops tested. The data collected was used in a way that Hunter did not approve; combining the psychological test scores with the location of where the individual grew up supported the notion of Nordic superiority, which was not his intention.

Hunter served as chairman of the Division of Anthropology and Psychology of the National Research Council from 1936 to 1938. During this time Hunter's influence contributed to the utilization of psychology by the government and the military during World War II.

From 1943 to 1945, he served as a chairman of the Applied Psychology Panel of the National Defense Research Committee. In 1943, he was unofficially drafted to direct and coordinate research for the military. Little has been publicly documented as to exactly what Hunter did during World War II. However, it was enough for President Truman to award Hunter the President's Medal for Merit in 1948, for “having recognized that research on the psychological and physiological capacities of man in relation to the new instruments of warfare could contribute materially to the more effective utilization of both military personnel and instruments”.

== Research ==
Hunter was interested in studying delayed reaction in animals. Through his research, he developed the idea of symbolic process. According to Hunter, this is the process by which specific animals can change their orientation to a stimulus during a delay and afterward still be able to remember where the stimulus was originally. Hunter believed that his work on the aftereffect of visual motion was some of his best. He was so interested in delayed reaction that he expanded his work to include children after the birth of his first daughter. Hunter observed his daughter between the time she was thirteen months old and sixteen months old. Hunter found that young children could demonstrate the appropriate delayed reaction even when their body orientation changed during the delayed period. Hunter agreed with the behaviorist point of view, however he continued to see consciousness and voluntary actions as problems that still needed to be explained. Hunter did not like the term psychology—he preferred to use the term "anthroponomy" to replace psychology. Hunter wanted to avoid misunderstandings that arise when the term psychology is used to describe his work. The term was not widely accepted and Hunter was mocked for his suggestion.
