= Journal of Experimental Psychology: Applied =

- Discipline: Experimental Psychology
- Language: English
- Edited by: Melody Wiseheart

Publication details
- History: 1995-present
- Publisher: American Psychological Association (United States)
- Frequency: Quarterly
- Impact factor: 2.1 (2024)

Standard abbreviations
- ISO 4: J. Exp. Psychol. Appl.

Indexing
- ISSN: 1076-898X (print); 1939-2192 (web)
- OCLC no.: 48793484

Links
- Journal homepage; Online access

The Journal of Experimental Psychology: Applied is a peer-reviewed academic journal published by the American Psychological Association on behalf of APA Division 21. The journal was established in 1995 and covers research in experimental psychology. More specifically, the journal includes "empirical investigations in experimental psychology that bridge practically oriented problems and psychological theory". The editor-in-chief is Melody Wiseheart.

The journal has implemented the Transparency and Openness Promotion (TOP) Guidelines. The TOP Guidelines provide structure to research planning and reporting and aim to make research more transparent, accessible, and reproducible.

== Abstracting and indexing ==
The journal is abstracted and indexed by MEDLINE/PubMed and the Social Sciences Citation Index. According to the Journal Citation Reports, the journal has a 2024 impact factor of 2.1.
