= Jennifer F. Kelly =

American psychologist

Jennifer F. Kelly is an American psychologist who served as president of the American Psychological Association in 2021, where she previously served at the board of directors. She is a former president of the Georgia Psychological Association. Kelly is from Gulfport, Mississippi.
