= Stanley Graham (psychologist) =

American psychologist (1926–2023)

- Born: November 26, 1926; New York City, U.S.
- Died: December 2, 2023 (aged 97); Selden, New York, U.S.
- Education: City College New York; Brooklyn College; New York University
- Known for: Past president, American Psychological Association
- Spouse: Dorothy
- Children: Jeremy
- Scientific career
- Fields: Psychology
- Workplaces: Fifth Avenue Center for Counseling and Psychotherapy (founder, 1961)

Stanley R. Graham (November 26, 1926 – December 2, 2023) was an American psychologist who was a president of the American Psychological Association.

== Life and career ==
Stanley R. Graham was born in New York City on November 26, 1926. He served as president of the APA in 1990. While serving as president, Graham felt that psychology education needed to shift some of its focus from long-term psychotherapy to resources that would assist clients in combating social ills. He later received the APA Award for Distinguished Professional Contributions.

Graham was a founding member of Division 42 of the American Psychological Association (APA) for Psychologists in Independent Practice. Dr. Graham led an APA task force to prepare psychologists in training for entry into healthcare delivery.

Graham died on December 2, 2023, at the age of 97.
