= Bart Rossi =

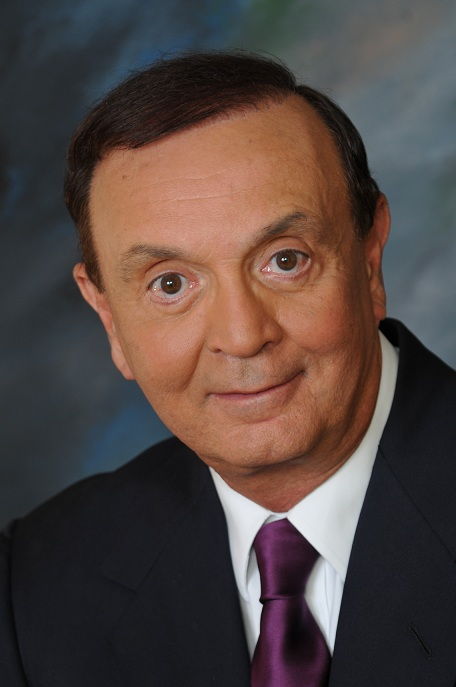
Dr Bart Rossi

Bart Rossi (born July 18, 1944) is a political psychologist who appears regularly on the news show Fresh Outlook. on Ebru TV. A career clinical psychologist, Rossi is author of the book "The New-New American Life Style Post – September 11, 2001, a Psychologist's Perspective".

== Career ==
Rossi began his career in private practice. In 1977 he founded the Rossi Psychological Group, P.A, where, as CEO, he oversaw a group of more than 50 licensed psychologists and medical professionals possessing expertise in specialized clinical areas.

== Media appearances ==
Rossi has been seen and heard on national radio in the United States, such as the Jack Burkman Show, and TV, like this segment where he discusses how teens deal with grief after tragedy. He discusses what drives politicians and elected officials to do the things they do, and been interviewed on topics ranging from random shootings to political scandals. Rossi has appeared on MSNBC, WCBS-TV, and also in print: in the New Jersey State League of Municipalities, and newspapers including USA Daily Review, USA Today, and the NY Daily News offering opinions on the VP debates.

== Associations ==
He is a member of the American Psychological Association, New Jersey Psychological Association (former board member), and the New Jersey Association for the Advancement of Psychology (former chairperson).
