= Robert J. Resnick =

American psychologist (born 1940)

Robert J Resnick
- Citizenship: USA
- Education: Syracuse University (B.A.); Temple University (M.S.); University of Tennessee (Ph.D.)
- Occupation: psychologist
- Organization: American Psychological Association
- Awards: Gold Medal Award for Life Achievement (2009)

Robert J. Resnick (born December 16, 1940) is an American psychologist and former president of the American Psychological Association (APA). He was a faculty member at Randolph-Macon College and established one of the first clinics dedicated to the treatment of attention deficit hyperactivity disorder. While practicing in Virginia, he was the plaintiff in the U.S. Supreme Court case that established the autonomy of clinical psychologists.

== Biography ==
Resnick graduated from Nottingham High School in Syracuse, New York. He received an undergraduate degree at Syracuse University, followed by master's and PhD degrees from Temple University and the University of Tennessee, respectively. At Syracuse, he was a member of the Syracuse Orange men's crew in 1960–61.

Resnick began his career at the Medical College of Virginia rising to the rank of Professor of Psychiatry and Pediatrics and Chair of the Division of Clinical psychology. He founded one of the earliest psychological clinics focused on patients with attention deficit hyperactivity disorder. In 1977, Resnick was the plaintiff in a Supreme Court case, Virginia Academy of Clinical Psychologists, and Robert J. Resnick, Ph.D. v. Blue Shield of Virginia. The case established clinical psychology's legal right to autonomous practice and reimbursement.

Resnick was a psychology professor at Randolph-Macon College. He received the Award for Distinguished Contribution to the Science and Profession of Clinical Psychology in 1993. He served as president of the APA in 1995. Resnick was an early promoter of prescriptive authority for psychologists. In 2009, he received the Gold Medal Award for Life Achievement in the Practice of Psychology from the American Psychological Foundation.

In 2008, the APA received a petition for a resolution condemning the employment of psychologists in institutions where people are detained in violation of the U.S. Constitution or international law. Resnick wrote the con statement to that petition, expressing concern that the petition was too broad and that it would be difficult to determine which settings violated the resolution. The resolution was subsequently approved following a vote of the organization's membership.

== Publications ==
Articles

- Resnick, Robert J. (2005). "Attention deficit hyperactivity disorder in teens and adults: They don't all outgrow it." Journal of Clinical Psychology, 61(5), 529–533.
- Resnick, Robert J., Ax, Robert K., Fagan, Thomas J., Nussbaum, David. (2012). "Predoctoral prescriptive authority curricula: A training option." Journal of Clinical Psychology 68(3), 246–262.
- Root, Richard W. and Resnick, Robert J. (2003). "An update on the diagnosis and treatment of attention-deficit/hyperactivity disorder in children." Professional Psychology: Research and Practice 34(1), 34–41.

Books

- Resnick, Robert J. (2005). The Hidden Disorder: A Clinician's Guide to Attention Deficit Hyperactivity Disorder in Adults.
- Resnick, Robert and Rozensky, Ronald. (1996). Health Psychology Through the Life Span: Practice and Research Opportunities.
