= Human Resources Research Organization =

American research company

The Human Resources Research Organization (HumRRO) is an applied research company founded in Alexandria, Virginia. It specializes in providing human capital management, education, resource analysis and training for government and private companies. Founded by Meredith P. Crawford, the company was established in 1951 as the Human Resources Research Office of George Washington University to study human resources for the Department of the Army. In 1967, HumRRO's charter was modified to extend its services to other departments of the Federal Government, to state and local governments, and to private companies and foundations. In 1969, HumRRO severed its connection with George Washington University and became a non-profit research organization. During its first 24 years, HumRRO operated as a Federal Contract Research Center (FCRC). The company's status as an FCRC was terminated at the end of 1975.

There are close historical connections between HumRRO and the American Psychological Association (APA). Meredith Crawford, the founder of HumRRO also served as the President of the APA's Division 19: Society for Military Psychology. Peter Ramsberger of the APA said that Crawford was "the founder and effective leader of one of the most important research organizations in the history of military psychology". William J. Strickland, HumRRO's President from 2008 to 2018, has also worked with the APA Division of Military Psychology and was recently elected to the fellow status of APA's Division 14: Society for Industrial and Organizational Psychology (SIOP).
