= Sport, Exercise, and Performance Psychology =

- Discipline: Sport psychology
- Language: English
- Edited by: Maria Kavussanu

Publication details
- History: 2011-present
- Publisher: American Psychological Association (United States)
- Frequency: Quarterly
- Impact factor: 4.25 (2020)

Standard abbreviations
- ISO 4: Sport Exerc. Perform. Psychol.

Indexing
- ISSN: 2157-3905 (print); 2157-3913 (web)
- LCCN: 2010208028
- OCLC no.: 664353990

Links
- Journal homepage; Online access

Sport, Exercise, and Performance Psychology is a peer-reviewed academic journal published by the American Psychological Association. The journal was established in 2011 and covers research "that supports the application of psychological principles to facilitate peak sport performance, enhance physical activity participation, and achieve optimal human performance". The current editor-in-chief is Maria Kavussanu (University of Birmingham).

== Abstracting and indexing ==
The journal is abstracted and indexed by PsycINFO, SCOPUS, and the Social Sciences Citation Index. According to the Journal Citation Reports, the journal has a 2020 impact factor of 4.25.
