= Norine G. Johnson =

American child psychologist (1935–2011)

- Born: December 3, 1935; Indianapolis, Indiana
- Died: November 19, 2011 (aged 75); Boston, Massachusetts
- Known for: Past president, American Psychological Association
- Scientific career
- Fields: Pediatric psychology

Norine G. Johnson (December 3, 1935 – November 19, 2011) was an American psychologist and a past president of the American Psychological Association (APA). Johnson was the founding director of psychology for Kennedy Memorial Hospital (later renamed the Franciscan Hospital for Children), ran a private practice and was on the faculty of Boston University School of Medicine.

== Biography ==
Johnson was born in Indianapolis. Her mother, Marie Collins Goode, was a teacher, and her father, Frank O. Goode, was a dentist. Johnson's paternal grandmother was married to a sheriff; he was killed when they were a young couple. Johnson often thought about the strength that her grandmother showed after that loss, and those thoughts inspired some of her professional research interests.

Johnson completed a bachelor's degree at DePauw University. She earned a PhD in clinical psychology from Wayne State University in 1972. After an internship at University Hospitals in Cleveland, Johnson was one of the earliest members of the budding specialty of pediatric psychology.

As a psychologist in private practice, Johnson had a clinical interest in the treatment of adolescent females. She was a consultant for the film 5 Girls, a documentary that followed the growth of five subjects from age 13 to age 17. She served on the faculty of Boston University School of Medicine. Johnson founded a hospital psychology department at Kennedy Memorial Hospital (which later became Franciscan Hospital for Children).

After learning that no woman had been president of the Massachusetts Psychological Association in almost 50 years, Johnson ran for and was elected to that office, beginning a two-year term in 1981. She served on the APA Council of Representatives and convinced the organization to sell Psychology Today; the APA owned the publication at the time but it was costing the organization millions of dollars. In 1997, she joined the APA Board of Directors. She assumed the APA presidency in 2001. Johnson, who aligned with the biopsychosocial model, was APA president when the concept of health was first acknowledged in the association's mission statement.

Johnson wrote three books. Her last work, a historical novel titled An American Family Myth, was finished after she was diagnosed with breast cancer. She was married to Wayne Woodlief, a columnist with the Boston Herald'.

She died of breast cancer on November 19, 2011. The Society for the Advancement of Psychotherapy (Division 29 of the APA) awards the Norine Johnson, PhD, Psychotherapy Research Grant.
