= Suzanne Bennett Johnson =

American psychologist

- Born: February 8, 1948 (age 77); Johnson City, New York, U.S.
- Education: Cornell University (B.A.); Stony Brook University (Ph.D.)
- Known for: Past president, American Psychological Association
- Scientific career
- Fields: Psychology

Suzanne Bennett Johnson (born February 8, 1948) is an American psychologist and a past president of the American Psychological Association (APA).

== Biography ==
Johnson earned an undergraduate psychology degree from Cornell University in 1970. She received a Ph.D. from Stony Brook University in 1974. Johnson was a fellow of the Robert Wood Johnson Foundation from 2001 to 2002 along with Hillary Clinton.

Johnson is a distinguished research professor at Florida State University College of Medicine and studies psychosocial aspects of childhood diabetes. At the University of Florida College of Medicine in the 1980s, she led a study which found more anxiety among family members of newly diagnosed insulin-dependent diabetes patients than among the patients themselves. She co-founded the National Conference on Child Health Psychology with James H. Johnson (no relation).

Johnson was APA president in 2012. She has served in several other APA leadership roles, including the presidency of Divisions 54 (Society of Pediatric Psychology) and 38 (Health Psychology).
