= Laurance F. Shaffer =

American psychologist (1903–1976)

- Born: August 12, 1903
- Died: July 20, 1976 (aged 72)
- Known for: Past president, American Psychological Association
- Scientific career
- Fields: Psychology

Laurance Frederic Shaffer (August 12, 1903 – July 20, 1976) was an American psychologist who was a past president of the American Psychological Association (APA) and notably served during World War II with the Air Force.

== Biography ==
Laurance F. Shaffer was a Lieutenant Colonel in the U.S. Army Air Forces, where he established the first pilot selection examining unit. During this time he worked on personnel selection and decision making. This led to the publication of Psychological Tests and Personnel Decisions. It helped him share his findings on decision-making processes, selection of personnel. It helps reflect his expertise on this matter as well as his contribution to psychological assessment and organization. He was a department chair at Columbia University and he served as editor of the Journal of Consulting Psychology.

Shaffer’s contributions to psychology are highlighted by his advocacy of the concept of mental hygiene, which integrated ideas of health promotion and psychological adjustment. He authored a notable book, The Psychology of Adjustment. He focuses on how individuals adapt to challenges and changes in their surroundings. It covers many topics including stress, factors of adjustment, and even coping mechanisms. It helps individuals understand and achieve emotional well-being and reflects his expertise in clinical psychology and his promotion of mental health.
