= Ronald E. Fox =

American psychologist

Ronald E. Fox (May 11, 1936 – March 14, 2018) was an American psychologist who was a president of the American Psychological Association (APA).

== Life and career ==
Fox was on the faculty at the University of North Carolina and Ohio State University early in his career. By 1975, he was exploring the possibility of founding a school of professional psychology in Ohio that would offer the Doctor of Psychology (Psy.D.) degree. He founded one of the first Psy.D. programs in the country at Wright State University in 1979. He was the APA's 1994 president. In 2009, he was selected to receive an APA award of excellence named after Raymond D. Fowler.

Fox advocated for the viewpoint that psychology should train its practitioners to think beyond simply treating mental illness. He wrote that professional psychology is "that profession which is concerned with enhancing the effectiveness of human behavior."

Fox died on March 14, 2018, at the age of 81.
