= Dorothy Cantor =

American psychologist

- Born: Dorothy W. Cantor
- Citizenship: U.S.
- Education: Doctor of Psychology (PsyD)
- Alma mater: Rutgers University
- Occupation: Psychologist
- Years active: 1976-current
- Known for: President, American Psychological Association
- Board member of: American Psychological Foundation; Rutgers
- Awards: Hall of Distinguished Alumni at Rutgers, 2009

Dorothy Cantor is an American psychologist and a former president of the American Psychological Association.

== Biography ==
In 1976, Cantor graduated from Rutgers University with a Doctor of Psychology (PsyD) degree. She was in the first graduating class of the Rutgers PsyD program. Rutgers was the second school in the U.S. to offer the degree, which was focused on professional practice rather than on preparation for academia.

Cantor has held leadership roles in several organizations, including a term as president of the New Jersey Psychological Association and service on the board of trustees at Rutgers. She co-founded the political action committee known as Women in Psychology for Legislative Action. Until Cantor joined the APA leadership in the 1990s, the organization had been led by PhD-prepared academics and researchers. She served as APA president in 1996 and was the eighth woman to hold the position. She was the first female in professional practice and the first holder of a PsyD to head the association. Cantor has also served as president of the American Psychological Foundation.

Cantor was selected to the Hall of Distinguished Alumni at Rutgers in 2009.
