= Psychotherapy (journal) =

- Discipline: Psychotherapy
- Language: English
- Edited by: Mark Hilsenroth

Publication details
- History: 1963-present
- Publisher: American Psychological Association (United States)
- Frequency: Quarterly
- Impact factor: 6.596 (2020)

Standard abbreviations
- ISO 4: Psychotherapy

Indexing
- ISSN: 0033-3204 (print); 1939-1536 (web)

Links
- Journal homepage; Online access

Psychotherapy is a peer-reviewed academic journal published by the American Psychological Association on behalf of APA Division 29. The journal was established in 1963 and covers research in psychotherapy. The current editor-in-chief is Mark Hilsenroth (Adelphi University).

== Abstracting and indexing ==
The journal is abstracted and indexed by MEDLINE/PubMed and the Social Sciences Citation Index. According to the Journal Citation Reports, the journal has a 2020 impact factor of 6.596.
