= Norman B. Anderson =

American scientist (1955–2024)

Norman Bruce Anderson
- Born: October 16, 1955; Greensboro, North Carolina, U.S.
- Died: March 1, 2024 (aged 68)
- Education: North Carolina Central University, University of North Carolina at Greensboro
- Scientific career
- Fields: Psychology, Behavioral Medicine, Health Disparities

Norman Bruce Anderson (October 16, 1955 – March 1, 2024) was an American scientist who was a tenured professor studying health disparities and mind/body health, and later an executive in government, non-profit, university sectors. Anderson was assistant vice president for research and academic affairs, and research professor of social work and nursing at Florida State University. He previously was chief executive officer of the American Psychological Association (APA), the largest scientific and professional association for psychologists in the US. Anderson became the APA's first African-American CEO when he was named to the post in 2003. He was the editor for the APA journal American Psychologist. Prior to joining APA, Anderson was an associate director of the National Institutes of Health (NIH) and held other roles in academia.

== Early life ==
Anderson was born on October 16, 1955, in Greensboro, North Carolina, to Rev. Dr. Charles W. and Rev. Dr. Lois J. Anderson. After graduating from North Carolina Central University in Durham, N.C., Anderson earned master's and doctoral degrees in clinical psychology from the University of North Carolina at Greensboro. He received additional clinical and research training at the schools of medicine at Brown and Duke Universities, including postdoctoral fellowships in psychophysiology and aging at Duke. Anderson also received training in Mindfulness Facilitation from the UCLA Mindful Awareness Research Center at the Semel Institute for Neuroscience and Human Behavior, University of California at Los Angeles. In addition, Anderson was trained as a Certified Executive and Professional Coach through the College of Executive Coaching.

== Career ==
In 1998, Anderson was elected president of the Society of Behavioral Medicine, becoming the first African-American to hold the position. He was the founding associate director of the National Institutes of Health (NIH), where he was in charge of social and behavioral science, and was the first director of the NIH Office of Behavioral and Social Sciences Research (OBSSR). While at NIH, Anderson facilitated behavioral and social sciences research across all of its Institutes and Centers. Research in the behavioral and social research was under his purview in areas such as cancer, heart disease, diabetes, children's health, mental health, minority health, aging, and oral health.

Anderson was also a tenured associate professor of medical psychology and of psychology at Duke University and as a professor of health and social behavior at the Harvard School of Public Health.

In 2012, he was elected to the Institute of Medicine (now the National Academy of Medicine), which is part of the National Academy of Sciences.

Anderson published dozens of scientific articles and authored and edited several books. He was editor-in-chief of the two-volume Encyclopedia of Health and Behavior (2003) and co-editor of Interdisciplinary research: Case studies from health and social science (2008). For over 12 years he was editor-in-chief of American Psychologist, the APA's flagship journal.

With his wife, P Elizabeth Anderson, he wrote a health book for the general public, Emotional Longevity: What Really Determines How Long You Live, which was released in 2003.

Anderson retired from the APA in July 2015, following an APA authorized independent review report relating to ethics guidelines conducted by former assistant U.S. Attorney David H. Hoffman. Prior to the report's release, Anderson had informed the board that he would be retiring at the end of 2016.

== Death ==
Anderson died following a surgical error during a knee surgery on March 1, 2024, at the age of 68.

== Professional affiliations ==
- Editor in chief of "The Encyclopedia of Health and Behavior" and APA's flagship journal, "American Psychologist."
- Fellow of APA, the American Association for the Advancement of Science, the Association for Psychological Science, the Society of Behavioral Medicine and the Academy of Behavioral Medicine Research.
- Past president of the Society of Behavioral Medicine
- Past president, Steven Spielberg's Starlight Foundation Board of Directors.
- Member, Kappa Alpha Psi fraternity - Washington (DC) alumni chapter, Sp. 12

== Awards ==
- Elected Member, Institute of Medicine, National Academies of Science
- Honorary Doctorate Degrees: Chicago School of Professional Psychology; University of Maryland University College, North Carolina Central University, University of North Carolina at Greensboro
- American Association of Applied and Prevention Psychology, Award for Distinguished Contributions to the Psychological Study of Diversity, 1996
- Third National Multicultural Conference and Summit, Dalmas Taylor Award, 2003
- Division of Health Psychology, American Psychological Association, Career Service Award, 2003
- Lonnie Mitchell Annual Conference on Race, Ethnicity, and Substance Abuse, Award for Enduring Contributions in the Interest of Science, 2004
