= Ronald F. Levant =

American psychologist

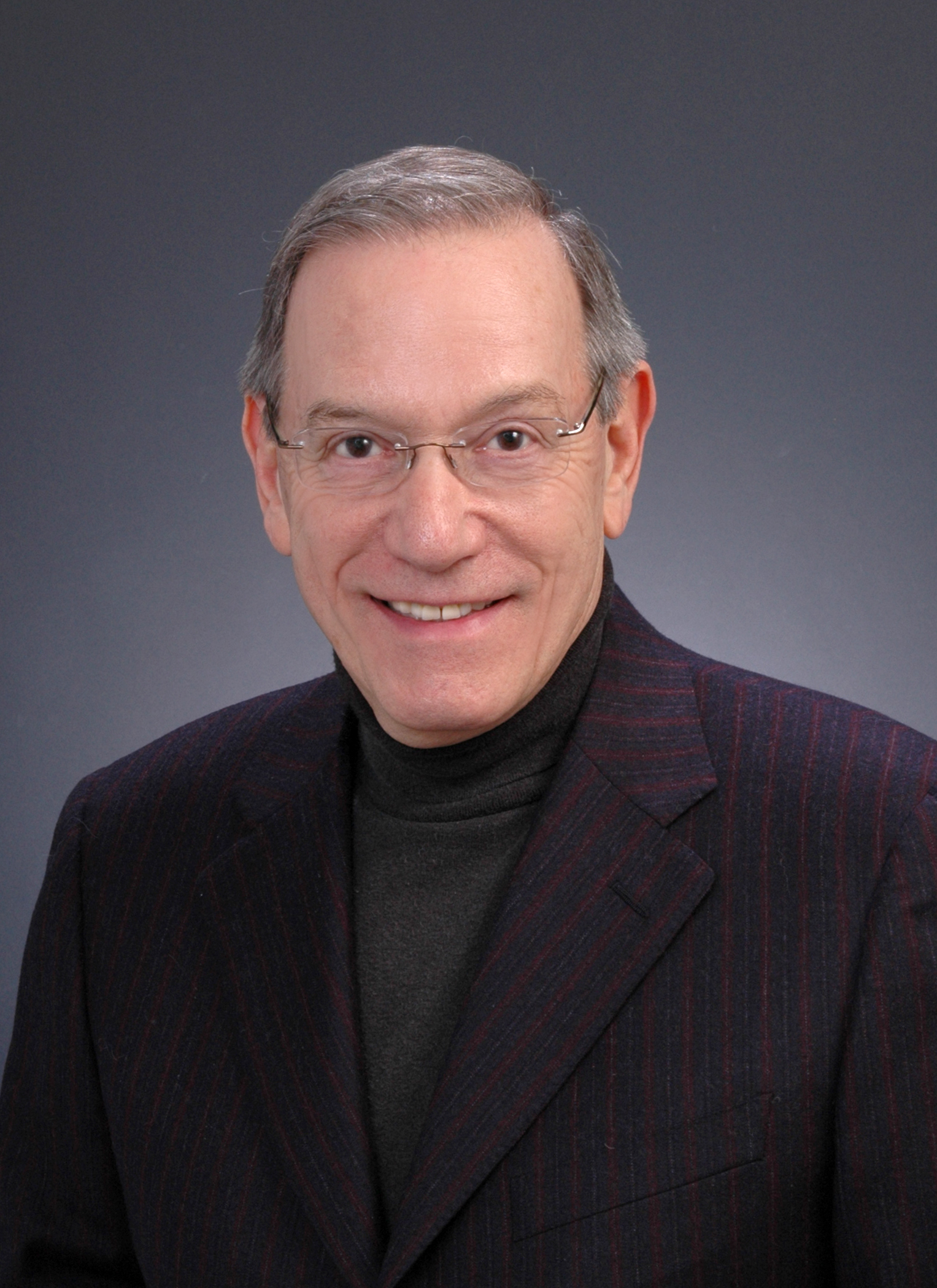
- Website: drronaldlevant.com

Ronald F. Levant is an American psychologist, professor emeritus at the University of Akron, and a former president of the American Psychological Associations (APA).

== Education ==
Levant earned an undergraduate degree from the University of California Berkeley. He subsequently completed a Doctor of Education (EdD) at Harvard University and Master of Business Administration (MBA) at Boston University.

== Career ==
Much of Levant's research and clinical work focuses on men and fatherhood. In the 1980s, while at Boston University, he taught parenting courses for fathers and co-authored the guide "Between Father and Child". He later served as the editor of the peer-reviewed journal "Psychology of Men and Masculinity" from 2007 to 2015.

Levant has held faculty positions at Harvard Medical School, Rutgers University, and Nova Southeastern University..

Within the APA, Levant served as president in 2005 and is a former president of two divisions: Family Psychology and the Psychology of Men and Masculinities. He is also a past president of the Massachusetts Psychological Association.. In 2011, he received the APA Award for Distinguished Professional Contributions to Applied Research. His 2020 co-authored book, "The Tough Standard", won the William James Book Award from the APA's General Psychology division in 2021.

== Selected publications ==
- Between Father and Child: How to Become the Kind of Father You Want to Be, Penguin Books, 1991 (with John Kelly). ISBN 978-0-14-015261-6.
- Family Therapy: A Comprehensive Overview, Prentice-Hall, 1987. ISBN 978-0-13-302885-0
- Masculinity Reconstructed. Dutton, 1995. (With Gini Kopecky). ISBN 0-525-93846-X
- Men and Sex: New Psychological Perspectives, J. Wiley, 1997 (editor, with Gary R. Brooks). ISBN 978-0-47-116903-1.
- The Psychology of Men and Masculinities, American Psychological Association, 2017 (with Y. Joel Wong). ISBN 978-1-43-382690-0.
- The Tough Standard: The Hard Truths About Masculinity and Violence, Oxford University Press, 2020 (with Shana Pryor). ISBN 978-0-19-007587-3.
- Assessing and Treating Emotionally Inexpressive Men, Routledge, 2024 (with Shana Pryor). ISBN 978-1-03-244469-7
- The Problem with Men: Insights on Overcoming a Traumatic Childhood from a World-Renowned Psychologist, Koehler Books, 2024 (with Alisa Bowman). ISBN 979-8-88-824432-6
