= California Association of School Psychologists =

The California Association of School Psychologists (CASP) was founded in 1953 and is located in Sacramento. CASP is the statewide membership organization for school psychologists in California. CASP has a membership close to 3,000. CASP represents the profession to legislative audiences, government, and other policy-making bodies. Publications of CASP include a quarterly magazine, CASP Today, and an annual research journal.

CASP members are work in private practice and schools throughout the state. They help school personnel support student education and solve their related learning problems. They also work with parents of students.

The association's governance structure is reflected in a 13-member executive board and an appointed slate of committee chairs and members who, together, complete the board of directors. The executive board is charged with policy-making for the organization and takes input and recommendations from committee chairs and the executive director in this regard.
