= Bonnie Strickland =

American psychologist (born 1936)

Bonnie Ruth Strickland
- Born: November 24, 1936 (age 89); Louisville, Kentucky, U.S.
- Education: Ohio State University
- Scientific career
- Fields: Psychology
- Workplaces: Emory University, University of Massachusetts Amherst
- Doctoral advisor: Julian Rotter

Bonnie Ruth Strickland (born November 24, 1936) is an American psychologist and academic. From her decades long career at Emory University and University of Massachusetts Amherst to her time as the president of the American Psychological Association (APA) she has contributed a great deal to clinical psychology, social psychology, and feminism.

Strickland was born in 1936 in Louisville, Kentucky and spent much of her early life in the south. She later went on to graduate school in Ohio to pursue a doctorate degree in psychology. As a closeted gay woman in the 1950s and 60s, she became very interested in learning about marginalized people through research. Strickland has become an important figure for psychologists and feminists alike and continues to contribute to academia as a professor at the University of Massachusetts to this day.

== Early life ==
Strickland was born on November 24, 1936, to Willie Whitfield and Roy Strickland in Louisville, Kentucky. She later moved to Birmingham, Alabama with her mother and brother after her parents’ separation and spent much of her childhood there. Strickland believes that growing up in the South had a major impact on her development in adolescence, and it could be considered a key inspiration for the research she has conducted during her career and her dedication to civil rights.

At age 14, Strickland joined a softball team that played an important role in her discovery of her identity. She met other girls that reminded her of herself, and through her team members’ support, she came to terms with her lesbian identity. Following the discovery of her sexual orientation, she spent time reading the Bible and other literature on the subject which led her to believe homosexuality was a bad thing, and she resorted to remaining closeted for a long time.

Strickland's high school gym teacher helped her apply to Alabama College where she was accepted. As an undergraduate at Alabama College Strickland studied and received a degree in physical education but was introduced and took interest in psychology by a professor of hers named Herbert Eber. She then went on to get a psychology doctorate degree at Ohio State University in 1962.

== Psychology career ==
In 1965 she started the positions of psychology faculty member and active Dean of Women at Emory University. During this time, she remained closeted, but she took part in an important psychology study that compared the mental health of homosexual and heterosexuals at the college. The data from this research showed that there wasn't an abundance of mental illness among homosexuals. In fact, the lesbians were found to have better mental health levels than heterosexual women. Following her time at Emory, she moved on to the University of Massachusetts, Amherst in 1973. While at Emory, she created a course on lesbian psychology which attracted many students’ interests.

In 1973 Strickland was a chair of the APA committee that pushed for more research on discrimination of marginalized groups. In 1987 Strickland became the seventh woman president of the APA. Additionally, she was the third ever woman president of the APA's clinical division and has served as president of the APA's Gay, Lesbian, and Bisexual division Strickland has been teaching at the University of Massachusetts Amherst for 46 years and is now a professor emerita.

== Accomplishments ==
Strickland is known for her time as president of the APA in 1987, but she has many other accomplishments of note. The APA Division 35 (Society for the Psychology of Women) issues the Strickland-Daniel Mentoring Award to recognize feminist mentoring in psychology. The award was originally known as the Bonnie Strickland Distinguished Mentoring Award but was later renamed to co-honor the award's first recipient, Jessica Henderson Daniel. In 2014, Strickland was awarded the Gold Medal Award for Life Achievement in Psychology in the Public Interest by the APA. Strickland has also written many pieces of literature related to her psychology passion. These works include The Gale Encyclopedia of Psychology, Including the Other in Psychology, and Misassumptions, Misadventures, and the Misuse of Psychology.
