= American Board of Professional Psychology =

Independent American specialty certification board

Coordinates: 35°52′54.9″N 79°4′0.6″W

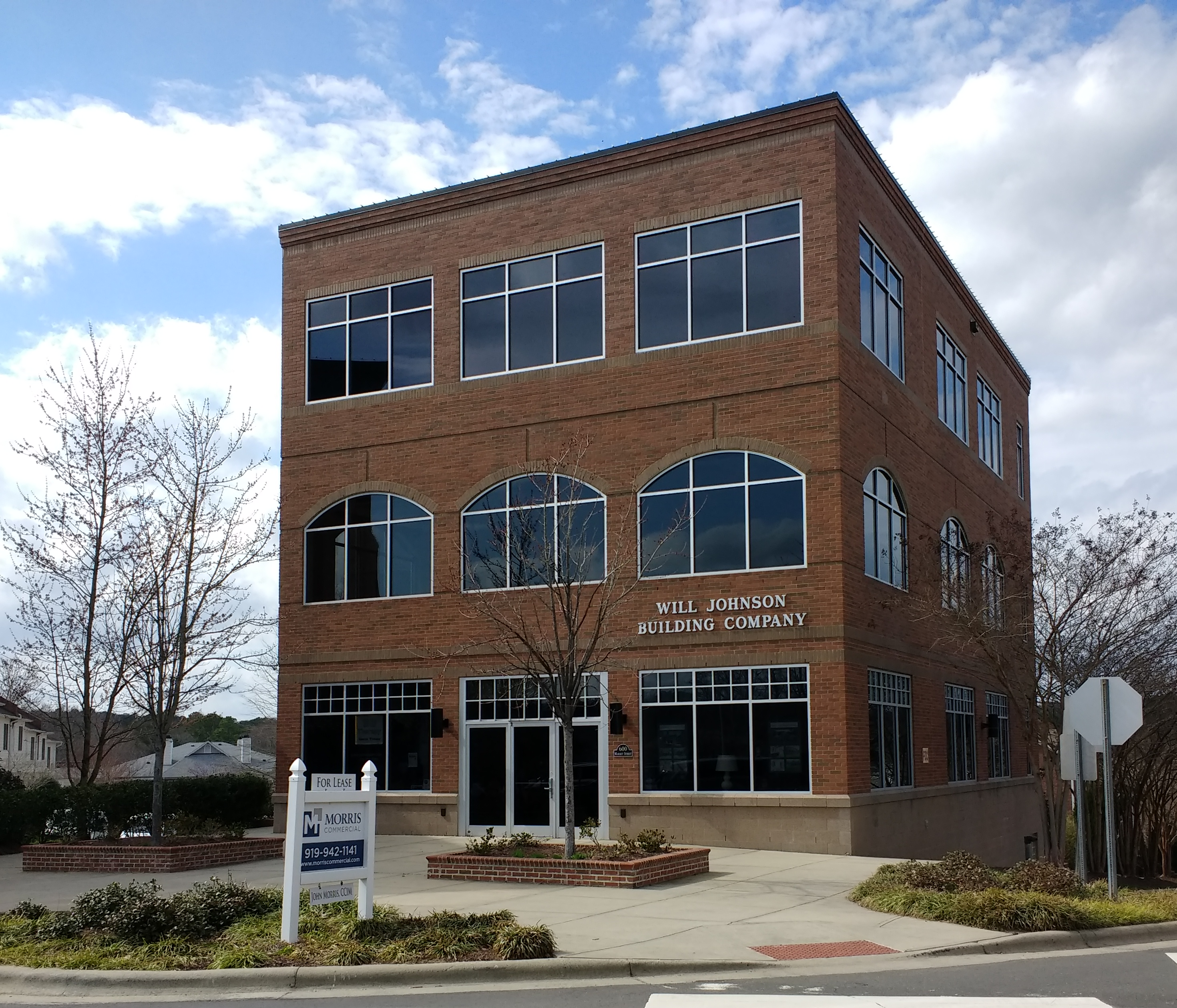
600 Market Street, Chapel Hill, North Carolina, location of the American Board of Professional Psychology

The American Board of Professional Psychology (ABPP) is the primary organization for specialty board certification in psychology.

== Mission statement ==
"The mission of the American Board of Professional Psychology is to increase consumer protection through the examination and certification of psychologists who demonstrate competence in approved specialty areas in professional psychology."

== History ==
=== 1947–1999 ===
The American Board of Professional Psychology was founded and incorporated in 1947, as the American Board of Examiners in Professional Psychology (ABEPP). When established, ABEPP replaced a committee that was formed by the American Psychological Association (APA) to explore the development of a credentialing body for individual psychologists. According to Bent, Goldberg & Packard, APA had come to realize that a membership organization, such as itself, could not advocate for its members at the same time that it performed certification functions designed to protect the public. Determining that a distinction should be made between basic and advanced levels of competence, ABEPP focused its attention to the latter and identified three fields of certification – Clinical Psychology; Personnel-Industrial (later becoming Industrial Psychology, and then Industrial/Organizational Psychology); and Personnel-Educational (later becoming Counseling and Guidance, and then Counseling Psychology). In order to recognize those psychologists already working in applied and practice areas, persons deemed to have sufficient experience and training (and awarded Bachelor of Arts degrees prior to December 31, 1935) were allowed to be "grandfathered" without examination. Those requiring examination were administered both written and oral components.

In 1968, the current name – American Board of Professional Psychology – was adopted, and a fourth specialty – School Psychology – was introduced. In 1972 multimember regional boards were implemented – Northeast, Midwest, Mideast, Southeast, Intermountain West and Far West. In 1974, the ABPP Board of Trustees (BOT) authorized the establishment of the National Register of Health Service Psychologists. It was also founded by Mack R. Hicks. Throughout the 1980s and early 1990s, new specialty boards were recognized – Clinical Neuropsychology (1984), Forensic Psychology (1985), Family Psychology (1991) and Health Psychology (1991). As new specialties were introduced, each seated a trustee on the BOT. As the 1990s progressed, additional specialties were identified – Behavioral Psychology (1991), Psychoanalysis (1996), and Rehabilitation Psychology (1997). Specialty Academies were also introduced as definitive membership organizations for specialists certified by ABPP.

=== 2000–Present ===
During the early 2000s, ABPP implemented several initiatives to further its mission. The Early Entry Option was created for graduate students, interns, and residents to start the board certification process early in their careers. In 2008, ABPP began to convene an annual conference with workshops. As a means of raising funds to support education on board certification, the American Board of Professional Psychology Foundation was formed in 2010. In 2015 ABPP seated its first Early Career Psychology (ECP) trustee. Maintenance of Certification was implemented in 2015, requiring that psychologists board-certified on or after January 1, 2015 undergo a formal review, ensuring their commitment to lifelong learning. Psychologists who received their board certification prior to 2015 received the option to opt-in to maintenance of certification or to waive the requirement.

== Certification Requirements ==
There are various requirements to obtain the ABPP certification, which are referred to as diplomas in the specialized area. The minimum requirements include:

- A doctoral degree
- Licensure within the psychology field
- At least five years of experience

In addition to the minimum requirements, there are also additional specializations demonstrated by the candidate. The candidate must also demonstrate the following:

- Specialized Training
- Evidence of substantial experience
- Continuing education in one of the thirteen specialty areas

A review of the candidate's work as well as an oral examination are also required to obtain ABPP certification. Some specialties require an additional written exam in addition to the oral component.

== Recognized Specialties ==
In 2026, ABPP recognizes the following psychology specialties (year of affiliation with ABPP in parentheses):

- Addiction Psychology
- Behavioral & Cognitive Psychology (1992)
- Clinical Child & Adolescent Psychology (2003)
- Clinical Health Psychology (1991)
- Clinical Neuropsychology (1984)
  - Pediatric Neuropsychology (subspecialty)
- Clinical Psychology (1947)
- Counseling Psychology (1947)
- Couple & Family Psychology (1990)
- Forensic Psychology (1985)
- Geropsychology (2014)
- Group Psychology (1997)
- Organizational & Business Consulting Psychology (1948)
- Police and Public Safety Psychology (2011)
- Psychoanalytic & Psychodynamic Psychology (1996)
- Psychopharmacological Psychology (provisional affiliation in 2025)
- Rehabilitation Psychology (1997)
- School Psychology (1968)
- Serious Mental Illness Psychology (2025)

== Board of trustees ==
The Board of Trustees consists of:

- A representative from each of the specialty boards
- Members of the Executive Committee (President, President-Elect, Past-President, Treasurer and Secretary)
- The Executive Officer
- A Public Member
- An Early Career Psychologist trustee
- A trustee from the Council of Presidents of Psychology Specialty Academies (CPPSA)
- The Editor of the ABPP newsletter, The Specialist, serves as an ex-officio member of the Board of Trustees.
