= American Psychological Association =

Scientific and professional organization

- Abbreviation: APA
- Formation: July 1892; 134 years ago
- Headquarters: 750 First Street, NE; Washington, D.C., U.S.
- Coordinates: 38°54′00″N 77°00′27″W
- Members: Over 190,000
- President: Wendi S. Williams
- CEO: Arthur C. Evans, Jr.
- Main organ: Council of Representatives
- Subsidiaries: American Psychological Association Services, Inc.
- Website: www.apa.org

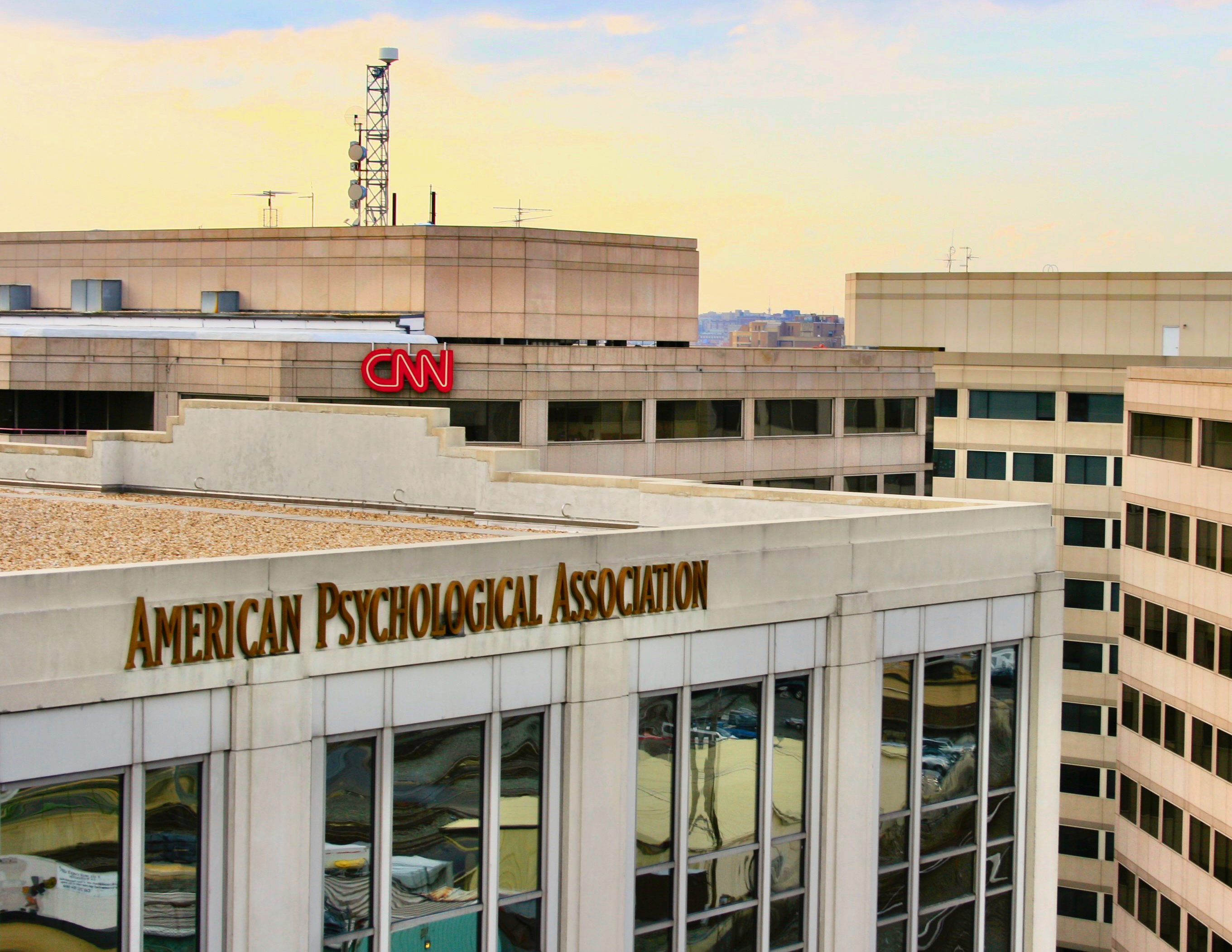
The headquarters of the American Psychological Association in Washington, D.C.

The American Psychological Association (APA) is a professional organization of psychologists in the United States, and the largest psychological association in the world. It has over 190,000 members, including scientists, educators, clinicians, consultants, and students. It has 54 divisions, which function as interest groups for different subspecialties of psychology or topical areas.

Through its Commission on Accreditation, the APA accredits graduate education and training programs in health service psychology. In September 2026, a federal advisory committee recommended suspending the commission's federal recognition for 12 months, citing regulatory noncompliance and alleged failures to address antisemitism in accredited programs. The APA disputed the recommendation.

== Profile ==
The APA has task forces that issue policy statements on various social matters, including abortion, human rights, the welfare of detainees, human trafficking, the rights of the mentally ill, IQ testing, sexual orientation change efforts, and gender equality.

=== Membership ===
Full membership with the APA in United States and Canada requires doctoral training whereas associate membership requires at least two years of postgraduate studies in psychology or approved related discipline. The minimal requirement of a doctoral dissertation related to psychology for full membership can be waived in certain circumstances where there is evidence that significant contribution or performance in the field of psychology has been made.

=== Affiliate organizations ===
American Psychological Association Services, Inc. (APASI) was formed in 2018 and is a 501(c)(6) entity, which engages in advocacy on behalf of psychologists from all areas of psychology. Its predecessor was the American Psychological Association Practice Organization (APAPO). APASI contains the Psychology Political Action Committee (PAC), which engages in lobbying on behalf of psychologists at the federal level.

=== Awards ===
Each year, the APA recognizes top psychologists with the "Distinguished Contributions" awards; these awards are the highest honors given by the APA.

- APA Award for Distinguished Scientific Contributions to Psychology
- APA Distinguished Scientific Award for the Applications of Psychology
- Award for Distinguished Contributions to Psychology in the Public Interest
- Award for Distinguished Contributions to Education and Training in Psychology
- APA Award for Distinguished Professional Contributions to Applied Research
- Award for Distinguished Professional Contributions to Independent Practice.
- Award for Distinguished Professional Contributions to Practice in the Public Sector
- APA Award for Distinguished Contributions to the International Advancement of Psychology
- APA Award for Lifetime Contributions to Psychology (APA's highest award)
- APA International Humanitarian Award
- The Mary Ainsworth Award for Excellence in Developmental Science

=== Publications ===
The American Psychologist is the association's flagship, peer-reviewed journal. APA also publishes over 70 other journals encompassing most specialty areas in the field; APA's Educational Publishing Foundation (EPF) is an imprint for publishing on behalf of other organizations. Its journals include:

- Archives of Scientific Psychology
- Behavioral Neuroscience
- Developmental Psychology
- Dreaming (published on behalf of the International Association for the Study of Dreams)
- Emotion
- Health Psychology
- Journal of Applied Psychology
- Journal of Comparative Psychology
- Journal of Experimental Psychology
- Journal of Experimental Psychology: Applied
- Journal of Family Psychology: Quarterly peer-reviewed academic journal published by the American Psychological Association on behalf of their Division 43. The journal covers all aspects of family psychology. It was established in 2011 and the editor-in-chief is Thomas L. Sexton (Indiana University). The journal is abstracted and indexed in PsycINFO.
- Stigma and Health, peer-reviewed journal published since 2016
- Journal of Occupational Health Psychology
- Journal of Personality and Social Psychology
- Psychological Bulletin
- Psychological Review
- Psychology and Aging
- Psychology of Addictive Behaviors
- Psychology of Violence
- Psychology, Public Policy, and Law
- School Psychology

The APA has published hundreds of books. Among these books are: the Publication Manual of the American Psychological Association (and a concise version titled Concise Rules of APA Style), which is the official guide to APA style; the APA Dictionary of Psychology; an eight-volume Encyclopedia of Psychology; and many scholarly books on specific subjects such as Varieties of Anomalous Experience. The APA has also published children's books under the Magination Press imprint, software for data analysis, videos demonstrating therapeutic techniques, reports, and brochures.

=== The Psychologically Healthy Workplace program ===
The Psychologically Healthy Workplace Program (PHWP) is a collaborative effort between the American Psychological Association and the APA Practice Organization designed to help employers optimize employee well-being and organizational performance. The PHWP includes APA's Psychologically Healthy Workplace Awards, a variety of APA Practice Organization resources, including PHWP Web content, e-newsletter, podcast and blog, and support of local programs currently implemented by 52 state, provincial and territorial psychological associations as a mechanism for driving grassroots change in local business communities. The awards are designed to recognize organizations for their efforts to foster employee health and well-being while enhancing organizational performance. The award program highlights a variety of workplaces, large and small, profit and non-profit, in diverse geographical settings. Applicants are evaluated on their efforts in the following five areas: employee involvement, work-life balance, employee growth and development, health and safety, and employee recognition. Awards are given at the local and national level.

=== APA style ===
American Psychological Association (APA) style is a set of rules developed to assist reading comprehension in the social and behavioral sciences. Used to ensure clarity of communication, the layout is designed to "move the idea forward with a minimum of distraction and a maximum of precision." The Publication Manual of the American Psychological Association contains the rules for every aspect of writing, especially in the social sciences from determining authorship to constructing a table to avoiding plagiarism and constructing accurate reference citations. "The General Format of APA is most commonly used to cite sources within the social sciences. General guidelines for a paper in APA style includes: typed, double-spaced on standard-sized paper (8.5" x 11") with 1" margins on all sides. The font should be clear and highly readable. APA recommends using 12 pt. Times New Roman font." The seventh edition of the Publication Manual of the American Psychological Association was published in October 2019.

=== Databases ===
APA maintains a number of databases, including PsycINFO, PsycARTICLES, PsycBOOKS, PsycEXTRA, PsycCRITIQUES, PsycTESTS, and PsycTHERAPY. APA also operates a comprehensive search platform, PsycNET, covering multiple databases.

PsycINFO is a bibliographic database that contains citations and summaries dating from the 19th century, including journal articles, book chapters, books, technical reports, and dissertations within the field of psychology. As of January 2010, PsycINFO has collected information from 2,457 journals.

== History ==
=== Founding ===
The APA was founded in July 1892 at Clark University by a small group of around 30 men; by 1916 there were over 300 members. The first president was G. Stanley Hall. During World War II, the APA merged with other psychological organizations, resulting in a new divisional structure. Nineteen divisions were approved in 1944; the divisions with the most members were the clinical and personnel (now counseling) divisions. From 1960 to 2007, the number of divisions expanded to 54. Today the APA is affiliated with 60 state, territorial, and Canadian provincial associations. After World War II, the APA experienced rapid membership growth, increasing from 4,183 members in 1945 to 30,839 in 1970.

=== Dominance of clinical psychology ===
Due to the dominance of clinical psychology in APA, several research-focused groups have broken away from the organization. These include the Psychonomic Society in 1959 (with a primarily cognitive orientation), and the Association for Psychological Science (which changed its name from the American Psychological Society in early 2006) in 1988 (with a broad focus on the science and research of psychology). Theodore H. Blau was the first clinician in independent practice to be elected president of the American Psychological Association in 1977.

== Presidents ==
APA Presidents from the present to 1892

2025 Debra Kawahara
2024 Cynthia de las Fuentes
2023 Thema Bryant
2022 Frank C. Worrell
2021 Jennifer F. Kelly
2020 Sandra L. Shullman
2019 Rosie Phillips Davis
2018 Jessica Henderson Daniel
2017 Antonio Puente
2016 Susan H. McDaniel
2015 Barry S. Anton
2014 Nadine Kaslow
2013 Donald N. Bersoff
2012 Suzanne Bennett Johnson
2011 Melba J. T. Vasquez
2010 Carol D. Goodheart
2009 James H. Bray
2008 Alan E. Kazdin
2007 Sharon S. Brehm
2006 Gerald Koocher
2005 Ronald F. Levant
2004 Diane F. Halpern
2003 Robert J. Sternberg
2002 Philip G. Zimbardo
2001 Norine G. Johnson
2000 Patrick DeLeon
1999 Richard Suinn
1998 Martin E.P. Seligman
1997 Norman Abeles
1996 Dorothy Cantor
1995 Robert J. Resnick
1994 Ronald E. Fox
1993 Frank Farley
1992 Jack Wiggins Jr.
1991 Charles Spielberger
1990 Stanley Graham
1989 Joseph Matarazzo
1988 Raymond D. Fowler
1987 Bonnie Strickland
1986 Logan Wright
1985 Robert Perloff
1984 Janet Taylor Spence
1983 Max Siegel
1982 William Bevan (psychologist)
1981 John J. Conger
1980 Florence Denmark
1979 Nicholas A. Cummings
1978 M. Brewster Smith
1977 Theodore H. Blau
1976 Wilbert J. McKeachie
1975 Donald T. Campbell
1974 Albert Bandura
1973 Leona E. Tyler
1972 Anne Anastasi
1971 Kenneth B. Clark
1970 George W. Albee
1969 George A. Miller
1968 Abraham Maslow
1967 Gardner Lindzey
1966 Nicholas Hobbs
1965 Jerome Bruner
1964 Quinn McNemar
1963 Charles E. Osgood
1962 Paul E. Meehl
1961 Neal E. Miller
1960 Donald O. Hebb
1959 Wolfgang Köhler
1958 Harry Harlow
1957 Lee J. Cronbach
1956 Theodore Newcomb
1955 E. Lowell Kelly
1954 O. Hobart Mowrer
1953 Laurance F. Shaffer
1952 J. McVicker Hunt
1951 Robert R. Sears
1950 Joy Paul Guilford
1949 Ernest R. Hilgard
1948 Donald R. Marquis
1947 Carl Rogers
1946 Henry E. Garrett
1945 Edwin R. Guthrie
1944 Gardner Murphy
1943 John Edward Anderson
1942 Calvin Perry Stone
1941 Herbert Woodrow
1940 Leonard Carmichael
1939 Gordon Allport
1938 John Dashiell
1937 Edward C. Tolman
1936 Clark L. Hull
1935 Albert Poffenberger
1934 Joseph Peterson
1933 Louis Leon Thurstone
1932 Walter Richard Miles
1931 Walter Samuel Hunter
1930 Herbert Langfeld
1929 Karl Lashley
1928 Edwin G. Boring
1927 Harry Levi Hollingworth
1926 Harvey A. Carr
1925 Madison Bentley
1924 G. Stanley Hall
1923 Lewis Terman
1922 Knight Dunlap
1921 Margaret Floy Washburn
1920 Shepherd Ivory Franz
1919 Walter Dill Scott
1918 John Wallace Baird
1917 Robert Mearns Yerkes
1916 Raymond Dodge
1915 John Broadus Watson
1914 Robert Sessions Woodworth
1913 Howard Crosby Warren
1912 Edward Thorndike
1911 Carl Emil Seashore
1910 Walter Bowers Pillsbury
1909 Charles Hubbard Judd
1908 George Malcolm Stratton
1907 Henry Rutgers Marshall
1906 James Rowland Angell
1905 Mary Whiton Calkins
1904 William James
1903 William Lowe Bryan
1902 Edmund Sanford
1901 Josiah Royce
1900 Joseph Jastrow
1899 John Dewey
1898 Hugo Münsterberg
1897 James Mark Baldwin
1896 George Stuart Fullerton
1895 James McKeen Cattell
1894 William James
1893 George Trumbull Ladd
1892 G. Stanley Hall

== Notable people ==
- Bart Rossi, psychologist and author
- Diane Willis, American psychologist, eponym of the Diane J. Willis early career award
- G. Stanley Hall, President of APA

== Divisions ==
The APA has 56 numbered divisions, 54 of which are currently active:

1. Society for General Psychology – the first division formed by the APA, in 1945, concerned with issues across the subdisciplines of psychology
2. Society for the Teaching of Psychology – provides free teaching material for students and teachers of psychology and bestows many awards
3. Society for Experimental Psychology and Cognitive Science
4. Currently vacant – initially reserved for the Psychometric Society, which decided against becoming an APA division after the establishment of the similarly defined Division 5
5. Division of Quantitative and Qualitative Methods – previously named Evaluation, Measurement, and Statistics
6. Division of Behavioral Neuroscience and Comparative Psychology
7. Division of Developmental Psychology
8. Society for Personality and Social Psychology
9. Society for the Psychological Study of Social Issues (SPSSI)
10. Society for the Psychology of Aesthetics, Creativity and the Arts
11. Currently vacant – initially Abnormal Psychology and Psychotherapy, which joined Division 12 in 1946
12. Society of Clinical Psychology – established in 1945 with 482 members. Became the Division of Clinical and Abnormal Psychology in 1946, and took its current name in 1998. In 1962 it created clinical child psychology as its first section.
13. Society of Consulting Psychology – originally Division of Counseling and Guidance Psychologists
14. Society for Industrial and Organizational Psychology
15. Division of Educational Psychology
16. Division of School Psychology – originally formed as the Division of School Psychologists in 1945, renamed in 1969
17. Society of Counseling Psychology
18. Psychologists in Public Service
19. Society for Military Psychology
20. Adult Development and Aging
21. Applied Experimental and Engineering Psychology
22. Rehabilitation Psychology
23. Society for Consumer Psychology
24. Society for Theoretical and Philosophical Psychology
25. Behavior Analysis
26. Society for the History of Psychology
27. Society for Community Research and Action: Division of Community Psychology
28. Psychopharmacology and Substance Abuse
29. Psychotherapy
30. Society of Psychological Hypnosis
31. State, Provincial and Territorial Psychological Association Affairs
32. Society for Humanistic Psychology
33. Intellectual and Developmental Disabilities / Autism Spectrum Disorder
34. Society for Environmental, Population and Conservation Psychology
35. Society for the Psychology of Women
36. Society for the Psychology of Religion and Spirituality
37. Society for Child and Family Policy and Practice
38. Society for Health Psychology
39. Psychoanalysis
40. Society for Clinical Neuropsychology
41. American Psychology-Law Society
42. Psychologists in Independent Practice
43. Society for Family Psychology
44. Society for the Psychology of Sexual Orientation and Gender Diversity
45. Society for the Psychological Study of Ethnic Minority Issues
46. Media Psychology
47. Exercise and Sport Psychology
48. Society for the Study of Peace, Conflict, and Violence: Peace Psychology Division
49. Society of Group Psychology and Group Psychotherapy
50. Society of Addiction Psychology
51. Society for the Psychological Study of Men and Masculinities
52. International Psychology
53. Society of Clinical Child & Adolescent Psychology
54. Society of Pediatric Psychology
55. Society for Prescribing Psychology
56. Trauma Psychology – addresses issues of trauma with projects, working groups and via collaborations

== Accreditation ==
The APA's Commission on Accreditation (APA-CoA) accredits education and training programs in health service psychology in the United States. Its scope includes master's and doctoral programs in clinical, counseling, and school psychology, including combinations of these fields. It also accredits doctoral internships and postdoctoral residencies. Accreditation applies to individual programs rather than entire institutions or individual psychologists. The commission is recognized by the United States Department of Education and the Council for Higher Education Accreditation (CHEA). CHEA's recognized scope includes master's programs, while the department's scope covers doctoral programs, internships, and postdoctoral residencies.

=== 2026 federal recognition review and suspension recommendation ===
In September 2026, the commission's application for continued federal recognition came before the National Advisory Committee on Institutional Quality and Integrity (NACIQI). Department of Education staff recommended continued recognition, with 12 months to demonstrate compliance with six federal criteria. These concerned program monitoring and procedures such as deadlines for correcting noncompliance and notifying regulators. Staff questioned why the commission had been unaware of a federal civil rights investigation involving George Washington University's professional psychology program.

At the hearing, Jewish advocacy organizations, faculty members, and practitioners alleged that the APA had failed to address antisemitism in accredited programs. Several speakers cited allegations that Jewish students at George Washington University faced retaliation after objecting to a guest lecture. Critics also questioned the use of "decolonial therapy" in psychology education. They argued that some approaches introduced political ideology into treatment and portrayed Jewish identity or Zionism as pathological. Other commenters, including proponents of conversion therapy, criticized the APA's positions on gender identity. Regarding the George Washington case, Insight Into Academia reported that an earlier university-commissioned legal investigation had found no evidence substantiating the allegations.

Witnesses also raised concerns about the wider association. These included its response to complaints from Jewish members, conference programming, and delays in recognizing a Jewish psychological organization. Karen Paikin Barall of the Louis D. Brandeis Center for Human Rights Under Law said that her organization sought stronger enforcement, accountability, and measures against antisemitism rather than punishment of accredited programs.

On September 24, NACIQI voted 7–4 to recommend suspending the commission's federal recognition for 12 months. The recommendation cited regulatory noncompliance and what the committee described as a "pervasive culture of antisemitism" in accredited programs. Some members opposed suspension and favored monitoring or compliance reports. The recommendation required a subsequent decision by the Department of Education.

The APA disputed the committee's characterization of accredited programs and opposed the recommendation. It said that testimony identifying two programs did not establish widespread antisemitism across its more than 1,300 accredited programs. It also said that the commission had begun investigating the complaints before the hearing. Aaron Joyce, the commission's executive lead psychologist, condemned antisemitism and pledged to review accreditation-related complaints. He distinguished allegations concerning accredited programs from those involving the wider association, which he said fell outside the commission's jurisdiction.

Broader criticism appeared in an October 2026 opinion article in The Wall Street Journal. Colin Wright and Andrew Hartz argued that the controversy reflected political activism displacing scientific and professional priorities within organized psychology.

As of October 2026, the commission stated that it remained federally recognized pending the department's final decision. It continued accreditation reviews and site visits. The commission also stated that its separate CHEA recognition would allow it to continue accrediting programs if federal recognition were suspended. It warned, however, that suspension could affect eligibility for certain federal training grants.

An October 2026 report released by the House Education and Workforce Committee accused the APA of dismissing complaints of antisemitism that had been in evidence in the organization in ways that "demonizes Israel, minimizes Hamas terrorism and portrays Jews as white oppressors", a claim that the APA's president dismissed, saying that the organization "unequivocally condemns antisemitism in all its forms".

== Sexual orientation and gender identity ==
=== Cause of sexual orientation ===
The APA states the following:

There is no consensus among scientists about the exact reasons that an individual develops a heterosexual, bisexual, or homosexual orientation. Although much research has examined the possible genetic, hormonal, developmental, social, and cultural influences on sexual orientation, no findings have emerged that permit scientists to conclude that sexual orientation is determined by any particular factor or factors. Many think that nature and nurture both play complex roles; most people experience little or no sense of choice about their sexual orientation.

In 1975, APA issued a supporting statement that homosexuality is not a mental disorder.

=== Conversion therapy ===
Conversion therapy, also called reparative therapy, is the practice of attempting to change the patient's sexual orientation to heterosexual. The American Psychological Association (APA) task force report on appropriate therapeutic responses to sexual orientation concluded that conversion therapy was "unlikely to be successful" and involved "some risk of harm". In the task force's report, the APA recommends that therapists adopt an affirmative, supportive approach for clients who present for therapy to change their sexual orientation rather than attempting to convert their sexual orientation.

The APA adopted a resolution in August 2009 stating that mental health professionals should avoid telling clients that they can change their sexual orientation through therapy or other treatments. The approval, by APA's governing Council of Representatives, came at APA's annual convention, during which a task force presented a report that in part examined the efficacy of so-called "reparative therapy", or sexual orientation change efforts.

The "Resolution on Appropriate Affirmative Responses to Sexual Orientation Distress and Change Efforts" also advises that parents, guardians, young people, and their families avoid sexual orientation treatments that portray homosexuality as a mental illness or developmental disorder and instead seek psychotherapy, social support, and educational services "that provide accurate information on sexual orientation and sexuality, increase family and school support, and reduce rejection of sexual minority youth."

=== Same-sex marriage ===
The APA adopted a resolution stating that it is unfair and discriminatory to deny same-sex couples legal access to civil marriage and to all its attendant rights, benefits, and privileges. It also filed an amicus brief in the federal court case in which Judge Vaughn Walker struck down California's constitutional ban on same-sex marriage. The APA later praised the decision and denied the existence of any "scientific justification" for a ban on same-sex marriage.

In August 2011, the APA clarified their support of same-sex marriage in light of continued research suggesting that the same community benefits accepted as result of heterosexual marriage apply to same-sex couples as well. Clinton Anderson, then associate executive director of the APA and director of the Office on Lesbian, Gay, Bisexual and Transgender Concerns, said that, prior to this research, "We knew that marriage benefits heterosexual people in very significant ways, but we didn't know if that would be true for same-sex couples." Anderson also put forward the APA's view that merely allowing same-sex civil unions is an inadequate option: "Anything other than marriage is, in essence, a stigmatization of same-sex couples. Stigma does have negative impacts on people."

=== Sex assignment ===
In 2024, evolutionary biologist Richard Dawkins and physicist Alan Sokal co-authored an op-ed in The Boston Globe criticizing the use of the terminology "sex assigned at birth" instead of "sex" by the APA, the American Medical Association, the American Academy of Pediatrics, and the Centers for Disease Control and Prevention. Dawkins and Sokal argued that sex is an "objective biological reality" that "is determined at conception and is then observed at birth," rather than assigned by a medical professional. Calling this "social constructionism gone amok", Dawkins and Sokal argued that "distort[ing] the scientific facts in the service of a social cause" risks undermining trust in medical institutions.

== APA internship crisis for graduate students ==
The APA is the main accrediting body for U.S. clinical and counseling psychology doctoral training programs and internship sites. APA-accredited clinical psychology PhD and PsyD programs typically require students to complete a one-year, full-time clinical internship in order to graduate (or a two-year, part-time internship). However, there is currently an "internship crisis" as defined by the American Psychological Association, in that approximately 25% of clinical psychology doctoral students do not match for internship each year. This crisis has led many students (approximately 1,000 each year) to re-apply for internship, thus delaying graduation, or to complete an unaccredited internship, and often has many emotional and financial consequences. Students who do not complete an APA-accredited internship in the U.S. are barred from certain employment settings, including VA hospitals, the military, and cannot get licensed in some states, such as Utah and Mississippi. Additionally, some postdoctoral fellowships and other employment settings require or prefer an APA-accredited internship. The APA has been criticized for not addressing this crisis adequately and many psychologists and graduate students have petitioned for the APA to take action by regulating graduate training programs.

== Warfare and the use of torture ==
A year after the establishment of the Human Resources Research Organization by the U.S. military in 1951, the CIA began funding numerous psychologists (and other scientists) in the development of psychological warfare methods under the supervision of APA treasurer Meredith Crawford. Donald O. Hebb, the APA president in 1960 who was awarded the APA Distinguished Scientific Contribution Award in 1961, defended the torture of research subjects, arguing that what was being studied was other nations' methods of brainwashing. Former APA president Martin Seligman spoke upon the invitation of the CIA on his animal experimentation where he shocked a dog unpredictably and repeatedly into total, helpless passivity. Former APA president Ronald F. Levant, upon visiting Guantanamo Bay, affirmed that psychologists were present during the torture of prisoners, arguing that their presence was to "add value and safeguards" to interrogations. Former APA president Gerald Koocher after being exposed as instrumental in rewriting ethics code, threatened to sue whistleblowers and suggested that they were struggling with unresolved grief and that the concerned psychologists were "opportunistic commentators masquerading as scholars."

During the Iraq War, Amnesty International released a series of reports, calling attention to violations of the human rights of prisoners in Abu Ghraib Prison and American detention camps, and the role of the United States and the United Kingdom in enacting these abuses. The reports called on the occupying powers to protect the human rights of any detained civilians by giving them a fair and timely trial, not detaining civilians arbitrarily, and treating all people ethically while in detention. Amnesty International also called for justice, by trying individual perpetrators of abuse for their crimes.

Despite these reports, the Bush administration instituted "enhanced" interrogation techniques, stating publicly that reported abuses were isolated incidents, and not standard practice. Internal memos from the Federal Bureau of Investigation revealed that an executive order by George W. Bush had sanctioned certain interrogation techniques, such as playing loud music, depriving prisoners of sleep, and stripping prisoners of their clothing.

The CIA reportedly required involvement from health professionals to continue its practice of "enhanced" interrogations on detainees, to maintain the lawfulness of their practices. Psychiatrists and medical doctors were reluctant to participate in interrogations, however some psychologists participated. A report by a group of psychologists alleges the same, implicating a number of APA officials as well.

When it emerged that psychologists, as part of the Behavioral Science Consultation Team, were assisting interrogators in Guantánamo and other U.S. facilities on improving the effectiveness of the "enhanced interrogation techniques", the APA called on the U.S. government to prohibit the use of unethical interrogation techniques and labeled specific techniques as torture. However, the APA declined to advise its members not to participate in such "enhanced interrogations". Finally, after the scandal broke, In September 2008, the APA's members passed a resolution stating that psychologists may not work in settings where "persons are held outside, or in violation of, either international law (e.g., the UN Convention Against Torture and the Geneva Conventions) or the U.S. Constitution (where appropriate), unless they are working directly for the persons being detained or for an independent third party working to protect human rights." The resolution became official APA policy in February 2009. However, the APA has refused to sanction those members known to have participated in and, in some cases, designed abusive interrogation techniques used in Guantanamo Bay, Iraq, and Afghanistan interrogation centers.

The APA directive was in contrast to the American Psychiatric Association ban in May 2006 of all direct participation in interrogations by psychiatrists, and the American Medical Association ban in June 2006 of the direct participation in interrogations by physicians. An independent panel of medical, military, ethics, education, public health, and legal professionals issued a comprehensive report in November 2013 that "charged that U.S. military and intelligence agencies directed doctors and psychologists working in U.S. military detention centers to violate standard ethical principles and medical standards to avoid infliction of harm." One group of psychologists in particular, the Coalition for an Ethical Psychology, has been very harsh in its criticism of the APA stance on its refusal to categorically prohibit members from participating in any phase of military interrogations. They stated their continuing disagreement with APA leadership in an open letter posted on their website on October 31, 2012, in which they reiterated their condemnation of torture and enhanced interrogation techniques, and called for the APA to require its members to refuse participation in military conducted interrogations of any kind.

After the abuses were made public, the APA created a task force called Psychological Ethics and National Security (PENS) and released a report stating that the APA Code of Ethics applies to psychologists working in any setting, and that psychologists do not facilitate or participate in any degrading or cruel behavior, referring back to the APA's 1986 Resolution Against Torture. The report also called on psychologists to report any suspected or observed inhumane treatment to the appropriate authorities and obey federal law.

=== Amending the Ethics Code ===
In February 2010, the APA's Council of Representatives voted to amend the association's Ethics Code to make clear that its standards can never be interpreted to justify or defend violating human rights. There is a history of similar issues with the Canadian Psychological Association. Following are the two relevant ethical standards from the APA Ethics Code, with the amended language shown in bold:

1.02, Conflicts Between Ethics and Law, Regulations, or Other Governing Legal Authority

If psychologists' ethical responsibilities conflict with law, regulations, or other governing legal authority, psychologists clarify the nature of the conflict, make known their commitment to the Ethics Code and take reasonable steps to resolve the conflict consistent with the General Principles and Ethical Standards of the Ethics Code. Under no circumstances may this standard be used to justify or defend violating human rights.

1.03, Conflicts Between Ethics and Organizational Demands

If the demands of an organization with which psychologists are affiliated or for whom they are working are in conflict with this Ethics Code, psychologists clarify the nature of the conflict, make known their commitment to the Ethics Code, and take reasonable steps to resolve the conflict consistent with the General Principles and Ethical Standards of the Ethics Code. Under no circumstances may this standard be used to justify or defend violating human rights.

In its 2013 "Policy Related to Psychologists' Work in National Security Settings and Reaffirmation of the APA Position Against Torture and Other Cruel, Inhuman, or Degrading Treatment or Punishment, the APA condemns the use of any of the following practices by military interrogators trying to elicit anti-terrorism information from detainees, on the ground that "there are no exceptional circumstances whatsoever, whether induced by a state of war or threat of war, internal political instability or any other public emergency, that may be invoked as a justification."

=== Hoffman report ===
In November 2014, the APA ordered an independent review into whether it cooperated with the government's use of torture of prisoners during the George W. Bush administration, naming Chicago attorney David H. Hoffman to conduct the review. On July 2, 2015, a 542-page report was issued to the special committee of the board of directors of the APA relating to ethics guidelines, national security interrogations, and torture. The report concluded that the APA secretly collaborated with the Bush administration to bolster a legal and ethical justification for the torture of prisoners. Furthermore, the report stated that the association's ethics director Stephen Behnke and others had "colluded with important Department of Defense officials to have the APA issue loose, high-level ethical guidelines that did not constrain" the interrogation of terrorism suspects at Guantanamo Bay. The association's "principal motive in doing so was to align APA and curry favor with DOD." An APA official said that ethics director Stephen Behnke had been "removed from his position as a result of the report" and indicated that other firings or sanctions might follow.

Ultimately, the findings of the Hoffman Report revealed that the APA had an unfair bias towards prisoners due to the organization's relationship with the federal government. This resulted in a tidal wave of consequences for the APA. On July 14, 2015, the APA announced the retirement of its CEO, Norman B. Anderson, effective the end of 2015, and of Deputy Chief Executive Officer Michael Honaker, effective August 15, 2015, and the resignation of Rhea K. Farberman, APA's executive director for public and member communication. Anderson had been CEO since 2003.

=== Ban on involvement ===
For at least a decade, dissident psychologists within and outside the APA, including the group WithholdAPAdues, had protested the involvement of psychologists "in interrogations at CIA black sites and Guantánamo." Prior to the release of the Hoffman report, which undermined the APA's repeated denials and showed that some APA leaders were complicit in torture, the dissidents were ignored or ridiculed.

On August 7, 2015, just weeks following the release of the Hoffman report, the APA council of representatives met at the association's 123rd annual convention in Toronto, Ontario. At that meeting, the APA council passed Resolution 23B, which implemented the 2008 membership vote to remove psychologists from settings that operate outside international law, and banning the participation of psychologists in unlawful interrogations. With 156 votes in favor and only one vote against, the resolution passed with the near unanimous approval of council members. The adoption of Resolution 23B aligned the APA's policy with that of the American Psychiatric Association and that of the American Medical Association by prohibiting psychologists from participating in interrogations deemed illegal by the Geneva Conventions and the United Nations Convention against Torture.

Implementation of the 2008 Membership Vote to Remove Psychologists from All Settings That Operate Outside of International Law (NBI #23B)

Council is asked to approve the substitute main motion below that includes a revised resolution with a new title, Resolution to Amend the 2006 and 2013 Council Resolutions to Clarify the Roles of Psychologists Related to Interrogation and Detainee Welfare in National Security Settings, to Further Implement the 2008 Petition Resolution, and to Safeguard Against Acts of Torture and Cruel, Inhuman, or Degrading Treatment or Punishment in All Settings. This resolution further aligns the APA policy definition for "cruel, inhuman or degrading treatment or punishment" (in the 2006 and 2013 Council resolutions) with the United Nations (UN) Convention Against Torture and ensures that the definition applies broadly to all individuals and settings; offers APA as a supportive resource for ethical practice for psychologists, including those in military and national security roles; prohibits psychologists from participating in national security interrogations; clarifies the intended application of the 2008 petition resolution... and calls for APA letters to be sent to federal officials to inform them of these policy changes and clarifications of existing APA policy.

The ban will not "prohibit psychologists from working with the police or prisons in criminal law enforcement interrogations".

== Class action lawsuit by members claiming deceptive dues assessments ==
In 2013 a class action lawsuit was brought against APA on behalf of approximately 60,000 of its 122,000 members who were licensed clinicians. Those members paid an additional $140 practice assessment fee as part of their membership dues every year beginning in 2001 to fund the lobbying arm of APA, the APA Practice Organization (APAPO). The lawsuit accused APA of using deceptive means by representing that the assessment was mandatory for APA membership even though payment of the assessment was only required for membership in the APAPO. In 2015 APA settled the case by establishing a $9.02 million settlement fund to be used to pay claims made by members of APA who paid the practice assessment, as well as attorneys' fees and certain other costs. APA agreed to change its policies to make clear that the APAPO membership dues are not required for membership in APA.

== Animal research ==
Currently, the APA enforces ethical standards to protect nonhuman animal subjects from unnecessary harm during the research process. Some of the requirements for using nonhuman animals in research include: proper justification of the research, maintenance and inspection of appropriate housing for the animals, minimizing discomfort and stress whenever possible, and preference of noninvasive measures.

Despite these guidelines, however, many advocacy groups exist to either reduce or eliminate animal research, arguing that it is unethical to capture animals and subject them to research procedures.

== Evidence-based practice ==
A current controversy among mental health professionals involves the use of the terms evidence based practice or evidence based treatment. Proponents of the evidence-based treatments movement argue that it is unethical to administer a therapeutic intervention with questionable research support when another treatment's effectiveness has been demonstrated for the client's condition, particularly when the intervention in question is potentially harmful (such as conversion therapy). Proponents argue that administration of an empirically questionable treatment violates the general Principle A of the ethical principles of psychologist: Beneficence and nonmaleficence (or "do no harm").

Critics of the evidence-based practice movement note ethical concerns regarding the research and practice of evidenced-based treatments themselves. Despite the demonstrated effectiveness of a range of treatments, including psychoanalytic and psychodynamic therapies, evidence-based practice is a term now associated only with short-term, manualized treatments which have been evaluated in randomized control trials. However, focusing only on randomized control trials is problematic when determining treatment efficacy. Among problems associated with this approach, one issue is that such trials are conducted on highly select patient populations. Thus, the relevance of these trials is unclear because real-world patients might differ from patients in such trials. Furthermore, while the public may assume evidence-based is synonymous for "likely to help", research studies indicate that most patients do not show meaningful improvement in so-called evidence-based treatments.

== See also ==
- Association for Psychological Science
- American Board of Professional Psychology
- American Psychoanalytic Association
- Association of Black Psychologists
- Canadian Psychological Association
- European Federation of Psychologists' Associations
- National Association of School Psychologists
- Peace psychology
- Society of Clinical Child & Adolescent Psychology
