= Naomi Goldstein =

American clinical psychologist

Naomi E. Goldstein
- Occupations: Professor of Psychology, Co-Director of the JD/PhD Program in Law and Psychology, and the Director of the Juvenile Justice Research and Reform Lab (JJR&R) at Drexel University.
- Awards: Allan Rothwarf Award for Teaching Excellence at Drexel University (2004) Holzberg Fellowship for Outstanding Commitment to Psychological Research and Treatment (1995)

Academic background
- Education: Massachusetts at Amherst (Ph.D.) Wesleyan University

Academic work
- Discipline: Clinical Psychologist
- Institutions: Drexel University

Naomi E. Goldstein is a clinical psychologist known for her research on juvenile justice reform. She is a Professor of Psychology, Co-Director of the JD/PhD Program in Law and Psychology, and the Director of the Juvenile Justice Research and Reform Lab (JJR&R) at Drexel University in Philadelphia, Pennsylvania. Over the last 20 years, her research has focused on racial and ethnic disparities among youth in the justice system, the school-to-prison pipeline, reform of juvenile probation systems, and adolescent development in making legal decisions in the justice system.

== Education ==
Goldstein graduated from Ardsley High School in Ardsley, New York, in 1991. She then received her Bachelor's degree in Psychology in 1995 from Wesleyan University. Goldstein then went to the University of Massachusetts at Amherst to receive her Ph.D. in Clinical Psychology, and completed her clinical internship at the University of Massachusetts Medical School in 2000.

== Career ==
While obtaining her Ph.D., Goldstein was a therapist, inpatient forensic psychology trainee, and Clinical Supervisor at the University of Massachusetts from 1995-1997. During this time, she also became a Forensic Evaluator and Assessor at Juvenile Court Clinic in Worcester, MA from 1999-2000. Once Goldstein obtained her Ph.D. in Clinical Psychology, she became a Clinical Supervisor at Drexel University where supervised clinical doctorate students conducting assessments, child and adult inpatient, outpatient, court-mandated programs, and residential juvenile justice facilities in Philadelphia, PA.

Goldstein started her career at Drexel University in 2000 when she became an Assistant Professor in Psychology, and she would teach undergraduate and graduate classes in forensic psychology and child psychopathology. Goldstein then worked her way up to Associate Professor at Drexel University from 2006-2016 and then became a Professor in Psychology in 2016 at Drexel University, where she is currently teaching undergraduate and graduate courses in Philadelphia, PA.

As of 2024, Naomi Goldstein is a Professor in Psychology, Co-Director of the JD/PhD Program in Law and Clinical Psychology, and the Director of the Juvenile Justice Research and Reform (JJR&R) Lab at Drexel University. She has also been a Graduate Faculty member in the Department of Psychiatry School of Medicine at the National University of La Plata, Buenos Aires Province, Argentina since 2012. As the director of the JJR&R lab, Goldstein collaborates with stakeholders to use cynical and developmental neuroscience to improve juvenile justice policies. She oversees all the staff in the lab and utilizes research to evaluate new programs and policy changes for youth in the juvenile justice system.

== Research ==
Over her career, Goldstein’s research has investigated youths' legal knowledge and ability to understand different court processes, such as Miranda Rights, probation, false confessions, and mental health in juvenile detention facilities. One of Goldstein’s most cited research articles examines Miranda Rights comprehension among juvenile offenders and their likelihood to falsely confess in mock crime scenarios. This research study used the Miranda Rights Comprehension Instruments (MRCI) Manual, which is a revised assessment tool Goldstein, Thomas Grisso, and Heather Zelle established that is used to evaluate individuals' comprehension of Miranda Rights. Goldstein’s Miranda Rights research has found that a developmental skill, such that youth cannot fully comprehend how waiving these rights can increase their risk of falsely confessing and being charged with a crime.

Goldstein’s research has also focused on school-based community programs that promote academic success and limit the involvement of youth in delinquent activities by examining the school-to-prison pipeline. The research regarding academic interest and success reveals that if students receive behavioral support and have a continued interest in academics they will be less likely to engage in delinquent behavior. Goldstein advocates for community-based programs to promote academic interest and aggression training programs for parents and teachers to appropriately respond to aggressive behaviors in school and at home without jeopardizing academic achievement among youth.

Goldstein’s most recent research is conducted in her Juvenile Justice Research and Reform Lab with collaboration from Rena Kreimer and Amanda NeMoyer, who both work with Goldstein as directors in research and training in the lab. The most recent research publications from Goldstein investigate school-based approaches to arrests and diversion programs for youth in Philadelphia, anger management treatment for juvenile females, and perceptions of law enforcement towards juveniles.

== Editorial and reviewer work ==
Goldstein has served on several academic journal editorial boards such as Behavioral Science and the Law; Psychology, Public Policy, and Law; Law and Human Behavior; and Criminal Justice and Behavior. She is currently an editor for the International Journal of Forensic Mental Health and has served on the editorial board since 2015.

Naomi Goldstein has also been a grant reviewer for several institutions across the United States, including the American Psychology-Law Society, Stoneleigh Foundation, the National Institute of Mental Health, the City University of New York’s Faculty Grants Program, and other departments in Pennsylvania.

== Awards ==
Naomi Goldstein won the Holzberg Fellowship for Outstanding Commitment to Psychological Research and Treatment at Wesleyan University in 1995 during her undergraduate degree in psychology. The fellowship is awarded to a senior who intends to pursue clinical or community psychology graduate study to apply future research to resolve societal issues.

In 2004, Goldstein received the Excellence in Teaching Award Nominee, Allan Rothwarf Award for Teaching Excellence at Drexel University, which is awarded to a facility member who has been teaching for at least two years who exemplifies high standards of teaching while developing research in their expertise.

Goldstein was also a nominee for the Outstanding Teaching Award at Drexel University in 2004.

Goldstein has also been awarded as a mentor researcher for undergraduate and graduate students in psychology multiple times through Drexel University over the last 10 years.

== Grants ==
Over Goldstein’s career, she has received over 50 funded grants to research the prison-to-school pipeline, academic success, racial disparities in justice involvement, and community-based programs for youth. Goldstein and her research lab have four funded grants that expire in 2025 or 2027 through several different organizations.

- Goldstein, N. E., & NeMoyer, A. (2023-2025). Expanding juvenile diversion eligibility to reduce disparities and justice involvement: Examining impacts of prosecutorial discretion via diversion policy changes in Philadelphia and Montgomery County, Pennsylvania. Arnold Ventures, Total Costs: $424,744.
- Goldstein, N. E. (2022-2025). Expungement Clinic Initiative Evaluation in Philadelphia. The Promise/United Way of Greater Philadelphia and Southern New Jersey, Total Costs: $1,800,000.
- Mandell, D., & Beidas, R. S. (July 1, 2019- 2025). The academic-community experience (ACE): A postdoctoral training fellowship in implementation science to promote mental health. National Institute of Mental Health, Total Costs: $1,567,711. Grant no. 5T32MH109433-03.
- NeyMoyer, A., & Goldstein, N. E. (2023-2025). Examining key factors in the prison-to-school pipeline: What promotes students’ successful return to school after juvenile justice confinement? Spencer Foundation, Total Costs: $49,976.

== Books ==
- Goldstein, N. E. S., Serico, J. M., Haney-Caron, E., Giallella, C. L., Kalbeitzer, R., Zelechoski, A. D., Riggs Romaine, C. L., & Kemp, K. (2023). The juvenile justice anger management (JJAM) treatment for girls. Oxford University Press.
- Heilbrun, K., DeMatteo, D., & Goldstein, N. E. S. (Eds.) (2016). APA handbook of psychology and juvenile justice. American Psychological Association.
- Goldstein, A. M. & Goldstein, N. E. S. (2010). Evaluating capacity to waive Miranda rights. Oxford University Press.
- Heilbrun, K. S., Goldstein, N. E. S., & Redding, R. E. (Eds.) (2005). Juvenile delinquency: Prevention, assessment, and intervention. Oxford University Press.

=== Forensic Assessment Tools ===
- Goldstein, N. E., Zelle, H. & Grisso, T. (2011). Miranda rights comprehension instruments (MRCI) manual. Professional Resource Press.
- Goldstein, N. E. S., Zelle, H., & Grisso, T. (2014). The miranda rights comprehension instruments: Manual for juvenile and adult evaluations. Professional Resource Press.

=== Intervention Manuals ===
- Goldstein, N. E. S., Serico, J. M., Haney-Caron, E., Giallella, C. L., Kalbeitzer, R., Zelechoski, A. D., Riggs Romaine, C. L., & Kemp, K. (2023). The juvenile justice anger management (JJAM) treatment for girls: Facilitator guide and participant materials. Oxford University Press.
- Goldstein, N. E. S., Serico, J., Riggs Romaine, C., Zelechoski, A. D., Kalbeitzer, R., & Kemp, K. (2007). The juvenile justice anger management (JJAM) treatment for girls. Drexel University.
- Parker, L. E, Gardella, J. H., Kreimer, R., Pollard, A., Anjaria, N., Rudd, B., Le, T., Bethel, K., Gray, A., Rufe, S., Fink, R., & Goldstein, N. E. S. (2022). Positive school safety program for school climate staff: Coaching manual (high school ed.). Drexel University.
- Parker, L. E, Gardella, J. H., Kreimer, R., Pollard, A., Anjaria, N., Rudd, B., Le, T., Bethel, K., Gray, A., Rufe, S., Fink, R., & Goldstein, N. E. S. (2022). Positive school safety program for school climate staff: Coaching manual (K-8 ed.). Drexel University.
