= David DeMatteo =

American law professor

- Occupations: Professor, Researcher

Academic background
- Education: B.A., J.D., Ph.D.
- Alma mater: Rutgers University, Villanova University, MCP Hahnemann University

Academic work
- Discipline: Psychology and Law
- Sub-discipline: mental health law, psychopathic personality, forensic mental health assessment, and offender division
- Institutions: Drexel University

David DeMatteo is a professor of psychology, law, and the Director of the JD/PHD Program at Drexel University in the Department of Psychological and Brain Sciences. DeMatteo's goal is to identify ways to influence law, policy, and practice using social science research. His research focuses on forensic mental health and how it can influence law and policy. Outside of his research and teaching, he has edited for several journals.

== Education ==
DeMatteo received his Bachelor's of Arts degree in Psychology from Rutgers University. He then went on to earn his Master's of Arts Clinical Psychology from MCP Hahnemann University. Then, he received a JD from Villanova University School of Law. Finally, he received his PhD from MCP Hahnemann University in 2002. At MCP Hahnemann University, his dissertation in fulfillment of graduation was "Psychopathy in a non-institutionalized population: Behavioral, personality, and affective characteristics." He completed his dissertation under the supervision of Kirk Heilbrun, as well as other committee members. This dissertation was interested in the comparison of psychopathic characteristics between institutionalized and non-institutionalized individuals in the greater Philadelphia area. In the literature review, he discusses the conception of what is defined as psychopathy and how there is a debate between what psychopathology is and how it presents in different populations.

== Career ==
Before graduating with his PhD, DeMatteo was an adjunct instructor of psychology at Drexel and at his alma mater Rutgers. After graduating from MCP Hahnemann University in 2002, DeMatteo went on to teach as an adjunct professor at Villanova and at Widener University between 2003 and 2006. At the same time, DeMatteo was working as a research scientist at a Treatment Research Institute. He went on to work as a Professor at Drexel University beginning in 2006 as an adjunct in Psychology first, then in Law in 2010. As well as teaching in both the psychology and the law department at Drexel, he is the Director of the JD/PHD Program in Law and Clinical Psychology. DeMatteo has consulted with both city and state agencies, legislators, correctional facilities, and law enforcement. He uses his research to conduct mental health assessments as well as testifying as an expert witness in state and federal courts.

DeMatteo has licenses as a Psychologist in Pennsylvania, in Forensic Psychology by the American Board of Professional Psychology, and had been certified as a Basic Forensic Evaluator in Virginia in 2001. He is a Fellow of the American Psychological Association (Divisions 12 and 41), a Fellow of the American Academy of Forensic Psychology, and board-certified in forensic psychology by the American Board of Professional Psychology. He has also served as Chair of the Committee to Revise the APA Specialty Guidelines for Forensic Psychology. DeMatteo has created, in conjunction with Palo Alto University, two Concepts programs for purchase. He presents two programs, one being "AAFP: Evidence for Mental Health Professionals" and "Evidence for Mental Health Professionals."

=== Editorial and reviewer positions ===
DeMatteo has been an associate reviewer for the American Psychology-Law Society News, Journal of Forensic Psychology Practice, as well as Law and Human Behavior. He has served on the advisory board for the Mental Health Law and Policy Journal, as well as the editorial board for several journals, including the American Psychologist, Behavioral Sciences and the Law, and more. DeMatteo has been an Ad Hoc Reviewer for several journals, a proposal reviewer for the APA and AP-LS, an Executive Editor for the Villanova Law Review, and a grant reviewer for several organizations.

=== Books ===
- DeMatteo, D & Heilbrun, K (Eds.). (2002). Forensic mental health assessment: A casebook. Oxford University Press.
- DeMatteo, D., Murrie, D. C., Anumba, N. M., & Keesler, M. E. (2011). Forensic mental health assessments in death penalty cases. Oxford University Press.
- Heilbrun, K., DeMatteo, D., King, C., & Filone, S. (Eds.). (2017). Evaluating Juvenile Transfer and Disposition: Law, Science, and Practice. Routledge.
- DeMatteo, D., Fairfax-Columbo, J., & Desai, A. (Eds.). (2019). Becoming a Forensic Psychologist. Routledge.
- DeMatteo, D., Heilbrun, K., Thornewill, A., Arnold, S. (Eds.). (2019). Problem-Solving Courts and the Criminal Justice System. Oxford University Press.
- DeMatteo, D. & Scherr, K., (2023). The Oxford Handbook of Psychology and Law. Oxford University Press.
- Bornstein, B., Miller, M., DeMatteo, D. (2022) (6th Ed.). Advances in Psychology & Law. Springer.

== Research ==
David DeMatteo has a research lab of his own at Drexel University, the David DeMatteo Lab. This lab consists of undergraduate, MS, PhD, and JD/PhD students.
