= Zapf =

Zapf is a surname. Notable people with the surname include:

- Gudrun Zapf-von Hesse (1918–2019), German typographer and calligrapher, wife of Hermann Zapf
- Helmut Zapf (born 1956), German composer
- Hermann Zapf (1918–2015), German typeface designer, professor, calligrapher, and typographer, husband of Gudrun Zapf-von Hesse
- Manfred Zapf (born 1946), German football player and manager
- Patricia Zapf, clinical psychologist known for her work in forensic psychology
- Uta Zapf (born 1941), German Bundestag member (SPD)
- Vivien Zapf, research scientist at the Los Alamos National Laboratory, US
- Wolfgang Zapf (1937–2018), German sociologist

== See also ==
- Zapf Creations, doll makers
