= Patricia Zapf =

American clinical psychologist

- Occupation: Licensed clinical psychologist

Academic background
- Education: Ph.D., Simon Fraser University (1999) M.A., Simon Fraser University (1995) B.A. (Honors), University of Alberta (1993)

Academic work
- Discipline: Forensic Psychologist
- Sub-discipline: Competency to stand trial
- Institutions: Palo Alto University Simon Fraser University John Jay College of Criminal Justice, CUNY

Patricia Zapf is a licensed clinical psychologist known for her work in forensic psychology, specializing in competency to stand trial. Zapf spent sixteen years as a professor of psychology at John Jay College of Criminal Justice prior to joining Palo Alto University as the Vice President of Business Innovation and Strategic Advancement.

== Education ==
Zapf received her B.A. in psychology from the University of Alberta. She received both her Masters (M.A. in Clinical Psychology with specialization in Forensic Psychology) and Doctorate (Ph.D. in Clinical Psychology with specialization in Forensic Psychology) from Simon Fraser University in British Columbia, Canada, focusing on competency to stand trial. Under the mentorship of Ronald Roesch, she completed her thesis, titled "Assessing fitness to stand trial: characteristics of fitness remands and a comparison of institution-based evaluations and the Fitness Interview Test, Revised", and her dissertation titled "An investigation of the construct of competence in a criminal and civil context: A comparison of the FIT, the MacCAT-CA, and the MacCAT-T.". She is a licensed psychologist in four states in the United States: Alabama, Florida, New York and Missouri.

== Career ==
Upon completion of her doctoral program, Zapf worked at the University of Alabama as an Assistant Professor in the Psychology Department until 2002. She concurrently began and maintains faculty affiliate status at Simon Fraser University in their Mental Health, Law and Policy Institute. After leaving the University of Alabama, Zapf held various positions at John Jay College of Criminal Justice at The City University of New York, including Director of Clinical Training, Director of the Forensic Psychology Research Institute, Associate Professor and Professor in the Department of Psychology. From 2014 to 2015, Zapf was president of the American Psychology-Law Society. Currently, Zapf is Vice President of Business Innovation and Strategic Advancement at Palo Alto University, where she works to advance academia by implementing business strategies to strengthen academia's impact. Zapf founded CONCEPT Professional Training, a program that provides continuing education to mental health professionals, in 2009. In 2018, she brought CONCEPT to Palo Alto University.

She has worked on the board of directors for the International Association of Forensic Mental Health Services, alongside having been an editor for Law and Human Behavior, the American Psychology-Law Society book series, and the International Perspectives on Forensic Mental Health book series. Zapf serves as the editor-in-chief of the APA Handbook of Forensic Psychology. Alongside traveling throughout the United States and internationally to provide training in forensic evaluation, Zapf served on the panel of experts for the National Judicial College's Mental Competency: Best Practices Model.

== Research ==
Zapf has focused on competency since her doctoral program, writing her dissertation on competency in both criminal and civil trials. She has examined the issue in a number of articles, evaluating the current research and instruments used for competency assessment, including a meta-analysis in 2011. She wrote Evaluation of Competence to Stand Trial with her mentor, Ronald Roesch, in which they cover the entire process of evaluating an individual for competency, in addition to addressing the significant concepts related to understanding competency. One article of repute she wrote investigated the discrepancies between mental health professionals and the courts' determinations of competency. Zapf and Roesch also created a forensic assessment instrument called The Fitness Interview Test used in assessing for competency. The Fitness Interview Test was found to be a good screener when deciding if a defendant needs inpatient psychiatric treatment to be fit to stand trial.

Zapf's research also lies in forensic evaluations and bridging the gap in understanding between the legal field and psychology, running trainings for both mental health and legal professionals. Much of this research culminated in two books, both co-authored with Roesch: Forensic assessments in criminal and civil law : a handbook for lawyers (a handbook for attorneys to better understand what to anticipate from a forensic mental health assessment, given that there is not one standard procedure) and Forensic Psychology and Law (an exploration of legal topics and psychology).

In more recent years, Zapf has researched and written on cognitive biases in forensic assessment. She has researched how to identify and mitigate bias in forensic evaluations, as well as how aware forensic evaluators are of their own biases. She created a seven-level taxonomy based on Sir Francis Bacon's doctrine of idols to examine how biases can arise and how to mitigate these biases.

== Honors ==
- Fellow of the American Psychological Association (2006)
- Distinguished Member of the American Psychology–Law Society (2006)

== Books ==
- Cutler, B. L., & Zapf, P. A. (Eds.). (2015). APA handbook of forensic psychology. American Psychological Association.
- Pirelli, G., Beattey, R. A., & Zapf, P. A. (2017). The ethical practice of forensic psychology: A casebook. Oxford University Press.
- Roesch, R., & Zapf, P. A. (2013). Forensic assessments in criminal and civil law : A handbook for lawyers. Oxford University Press.
- Roesch, R., Zapf, P. A., & Hart, S. D. (2009). Forensic psychology and law. Wiley.
- Zapf, P., & Roesch, R. (2008). Evaluation of competence to stand trial. Oxford University Press.
