= Jennifer Eno Louden =

American forensic psychologist

Academic background
- Education: PhD, 2009 UC Irvine; MA, University of Nevada, Los Vegas
- Website: enolouden.com

Jennifer Eno Louden is a forensic psychologist and associate professor at the University of Texas at El Paso. She directs the Mental Health and Criminal Justice Lab, where her research focuses on psychological factors that influence criminal behavior.

== Education ==
Eno Louden earned a doctor of philosophy in psychology and social behavior from the University of California, Irvine, in 2009. Her dissertation, titled Effect of Stigma of Mental Disorder and Substance Abuse on Probation Officers' Case Management Decisions, examined the effect of stigma on professional decisions made by probation officers. She holds a Master of Arts in Clinical Psychology from the University of Nevada, Las Vegas, where her thesis focused on measuring jurors' insanity prototypes. Eno Louden also obtained a Bachelor of Arts in Psychology, cum laude, from the same institution in 2002.

== Professional career ==
Eno Louden began her academic career as an assistant professor in the Department of Psychology at the University of Texas at El Paso from 2009 to 2015. In 2015, she was promoted to associate professor in the same department. She is also the psychology graduate program director at the University of Texas at El Paso. Her work has focused on "experiences of justice-involved people with mental illness and how the criminal justice system supervises this group."

Eno Louden has held positions at psychology journals, such as Criminal Justice and Behavior. She has chaired both the Corrections Committee and the Professional Development of Women Committee of the American Psychology-Law Society. She has also served as the representative from the American Psychological Association's Division 18 (Psychologists in Public Service) to the APA Science Directorate and as a Division Science Partner.

== Research ==
Eno Louden has conducted research on criminal justice and mental health. Her publications look at the relationship between parole/ probation officers and mentally ill offenders in regard to mandated community treatment in a criminal justice setting.

As the director at the Mental Health Criminal Justice Lab, her lab projects have focused on the mental health of Hispanic juvenile offenders, mental health of Hispanic female offenders, and self-stigma among Latinos along the U.S-Mexico Border.

She has also conducted research exploring psychological and policy factors related to responses to the COVID-19 pandemic, particularly in correctional settings. This work focused on the interplay between public health guidelines and psychological responses, highlighting challenges in correctional facilities during the pandemic. The study discussed considering mental health when developing containment strategies.

== Awards ==
- 2018, Hogg Foundation funding to conduct research on mental health.
- 2018, ConTex award through the University of Texas at San Antonio.
- 2019 "Best Paper Award" from the journal Psychological Services for the article, Social networks and treatment adherence among Latino offenders with mental illness.
- 2019, National Institute of Justice funding for, Crime and victimization on the US-Mexico Border: A Comparison of Legal Residents, Illegal Residents, and Native-Born Citizens in El Paso, Texas.
- 2022, El Paso County Pretrial Risk Assessment grant, sponsored by the county of El Paso, Texas for COVID research.
- 2024 Liberal Arts Community Engagement Award.
