= Barry Rosenfeld =

Clinical psychologist

Barry D. Rosenfeld
- Occupation: Professor of Psychology

Academic background
- Education: Ph.D. in Clinical Psychology
- Alma mater: Boston University (B.A. 1983) University of Virginia (M.A. 1991, Ph.D. 1992)

Academic work
- Discipline: Psychology
- Institutions: Fordham University

Barry David Rosenfeld is a clinical psychologist known for his research regarding psychological distress among terminally ill patients and immigrants, and stalking. He is a Professor and Department Chair of Psychology and Adjunct Professor of Law at Fordham University. He created the Memorial Delirium Assessment Scale (MDAS), which is used to measure the severity of delirium in terminally ill patients.

== Education ==
Rosenfeld received a B.A. in psychology at Boston University in 1983. He then received a M.A. in clinical psychology at the University of Virginia in 1991. The following year, he received a Ph.D. in clinical psychology at the University of Virginia. In 1991 he was awarded the Dissertation Award from American Psychology-Law Society. His Ph.D. thesis, Decision-making competence of the mentally ill: A longitudinal analysis of treatment decision-making, was published in May of 1992 and examined the effect of mental conditions on psychiatric patients' abilities to make informed decisions regarding medication.

== Career ==
Rosenfeld began his career in 1991 as a pre-doctoral intern for the Kirby Forensic Psychiatry Center at New York University, where he continued to work as a post-doctoral fellow from 1992-1994. From 1994-2000, he worked as a Senior Psychology at the Forensic Psychiatric Clinic at Bellevue Hospital in New York City. He then held the position of Executive Director at the Sexual Harassment/Assault Response Prevention (SHARP) program, the U.S. Army's program to prevent sexual harassment and assault within the army, in New York City. Since 1994, Rosenfeld has had an independent practice as a forensic and clinical psychologist.

In addition to clinical positions, Rosenfeld has held academic positions at three institutions in New York. His first academic position was at the John Jay College of Criminal Justice, where he served as Assistant Professor for the Department of Psychology from 1996-1997. He then served as Assistant Professor at Long Island University's Department of Psychology from 1997-1998. Since 2000, he has been a professor of psychology at Fordham University, where he has also served as the Department of Psychology's Chair since 2014. He teaches courses at undergraduate and graduate levels on psychology and law.

Rosenfeld conducts competency and risk assessments and consults as an expert witness for criminal and civil cases. Notable cases Rosenfeld has worked on include U.S. v. Osama Bin Laden following the 1998 U.S. Embassy bombings, Bowen v. Ruben, in which medical surgeries were performed on mentally disabled individuals who claimed the procedures were unnecessary, and Celikgogus v. Rumsfeld, the first of several lawsuits filed by former Guantanamo Bay detainees Rosenfeld would work on.

In 2011 Rosenfeld co-authored the textbook Research Methods in Forensic Psychology with Steven Penrod.

== Research ==
Rosenfeld has published over 100 articles for peer-reviewed journals. His areas of research include forensic psychology, psychological assessments of terminal HIV/AIDS and cancer patients, violence risk assessment, stalking, and trauma in refugees, asylum seekers, and immigrants. Rosenfeld's first published paper, Court-Ordered Treatment of Spouse Abuse, was published in 1992 for the Clinical Psychology Review journal.

=== HIV/AIDS and cancer patients ===
A key area of Rosenfeld's research is psychological distress in terminally ill HIV/AIDS and cancer patients. The first study with HIV/AIDS patients he published was Correlates of depression in women with AIDS in 1996. Rosenfeld has published multiple studies regarding pain management, depression, anxiety, and spirituality among HIV/AIDS patients. In 1999 he published his first study with cancer patients, Nurses' recognition of depression in their patients with cancer. Similar to his research with HIV/AIDS patients, Rosenfeld's research with cancer patients studies depression, anxiety, and spirituality.

In 1999 Rosenfeld published his first study on physician-assisted suicide and found high rates of depression to be a key factor for cancer patients to seek assisted suicide. Rosenfeld also examined the Schedule of Attitudes toward Hastened Death (SAHD), a scale used to measure HIV/AIDS patients' desire to die, with cancer patients and found it to be a reliable measurement for both populations.

=== Stalking and violence risk assessment ===
Rosenfeld's study on stalking in 2003 was the first study on recidivism rates and their predicting factors in stalking offenders. It found stalking offenders to have high rates of recidivism, with the strongest predicting factor for recidivism being the presence of a Cluster B personality disorder. Since this study, Rosenfeld has published several others examining stalking and treatment of stalking offenders.

An area Rosenfeld focuses on in his research with stalking is violence risk assessment of stalking offenders. Rosenfeld has conducted several studies examining factors that increase the risk of a stalking offender using violence or committing homicide against their victim. In one study, Rosenfeld found substance abuse, prior threats of violence and violent behavior by the offender, and an intimate relationship between the offender and the victim were strong predictors for violence perpetuated by the stalking offender. Research by Rosenfeld has found measures for risk assessment are reliable across both men and women.

=== Trauma in immigrants, refugees, and asylum seekers ===
Beginning in the 2000s, Rosenfeld would study rates of trauma in immigrants, refugees, and asylum seekers. His first study with trauma in asylum seekers, The Impact of Detention on the Health of Asylum Seekers, was published in 2003 and found asylum seekers in the U.S. who were detained displayed symptoms of post-traumatic stress disorder (PTSD) and asserted detention is detrimental to the mental health of asylum seekers. In another study published a month later, Rosenfeld found that time spent detained is correlated to the severity of PTSD symptoms exhibited by asylum seekers in the U.S.

A 2007 study by Rosenfeld found that rape is the largest predictive factor for PTSD among male and female refugees in the U.S. Rosenfeld has also worked with undocumented immigrants, and a study by him found that although undocumented immigrants are more likely to experience traumatic events, the likelihood they develop PTSD remains low and depends on if they perceive the event as life-threatening.

=== Memorial Delirium Assessment Scale (MDAS) ===
Introduced in 1997 by Rosenfeld and his colleagues, the Memorial Delirium Assessment Scale (MDAS) is used to measure the severity of delirium symptoms in terminally ill patients. The MDAS consists of ten items assessing patient's cognition, psychomotor activity, arousal, and consciousness, and disturbances within these domains. The scale uses the criteria from the DSM-IV for defining delirium. Rosenfeld found the MDAS to be a reliable scale to measure delirium within the first two studies of it. In 2000, a study by Eduardo Bruera and his colleagues further validated this finding.
