= Michael Saks =

Michael Saks may refer to:

- Michael J. Saks, professor of law at the Sandra Day O'Connor College of Law at Arizona State University
- Michael Saks (mathematician), professor at Rutgers University
