= Thomas Grisso =

American clinical and forensic psychologist

Thomas Grisso is an American clinical and forensic psychologist and professor emeritus of the University of Massachusetts Chan Medical School. Grisso's research has forged a pathway for the reshaping of Juvenile Justice systems' policy and adolescent forensic evaluation, for this, he has been coined 'The Architect". Grisso's father was a Brethren minister and his mother was a special education teacher; his parents were a significant inspiration for his research of juveniles.

== Personal life ==
Thomas Grisso married his wife Donna Grisso when they were in their 20s. Together they had one child. Besides his work, Grisso has a passion for photography.

== Education ==
From 1960-64, Grisso attended Ashland University for his undergraduate bachelor's degree in psychology and sociology. He later went on to study at the University of Arizona where he successfully achieved a PhD in psychology in 1969. Grisso completed his doctoral internship from 1967 through 1968 at Connecticut Valley Hospital in Middletown Connecticut.

In 1998, John Jay College of Criminal Justice, City University of New York presented Grisso with an Honorary Doctor of Laws.

== Career ==
Grisso's career began as an assistant professor for psychology undergraduate students at Ashland College, OH after he received his Ph.D. from University from Arizona in 1969. During this time, he provided therapeutic services to college students that led to an interest towards assessments in the youth population. He then became a consultant for the Ohio Youth Commission Forestry Camp where he focused on assessing delinquent adolescents. Grisso continued to teach at St. Louis University in 1973 as a professor for graduate students which led him to forming connections at the St. Louis County Juvenile Court. This resulted in the opportunity for his first funded research by The National Institute of Mental Health (NIMH) on juvenile's comprehension of Miranda rights in 1975. Later, he received another NIMH grant to write the first edition of Evaluating Competencies. Grisso was elected as a Fellow of the American Psychological Association.

Grisso moved to Massachusetts in 1987 to co-direct the Law and Psychiatric Program at the University of Massachusetts. The first edition of the Massachusetts Youth Screening Instrument was developed in 1998 with his colleague Richard Barnum, and then the second edition was published in 2001. He received certification by the American Board of Forensic Psychology in 1987 and was the executive director in 2003. Grisso was President of the American Psychology-Law Society from 1989-1990. He became a member of the John D. and Catherine T. MacArthur Foundation's Research Network on Adolescent Development and Juvenile Justice and its "Models for Change" Initiative from 1996 to 2015, which focused on juvenile justice and development.

== Research ==
Grisso's research influenced the reform of the juvenile justice system in many ways that changed the treatment services and view of adolescent offenders. In the 1990s he challenged the narrative of "Super Predator" through his studies on juvenile's competency to stand trial and developmental differences juveniles have from adults. His research impacted the "abolition of the death penalty" and "life without parole sentence" for this population in the court system. Grisso collaborated with the American Psychological Association on amicus briefs used in cases of the U.S Supreme Court, that resulted in restrictions on sentencing of crimes committed by juveniles. The Roper v Simmons (2005) case ruled on prohibiting sentencing juveniles to death, Graham v Florida (2010) ruled that sentencing juveniles without the possibility of parole was unconstitutional for non-homicide offenses and then Miller v Alabama, (2012) sustained the ruling for homicide offenses committed by juveniles due to the Eighth Amendment. Grisso's research provided evidence on developmental differences for juveniles in areas of maturity, competency, and decision making during this period that supported the notion of rehabilitation. In addition, Thomas assisted in the creation of evaluation tools such as, the Massachusetts Youth Screening Instrument (MAYSI) that was updated in 2001 to the MAYSI-2 that focuses on assessing for mental health services for juveniles entering the system, and the MacArthur Competence Assessment Tool for Treatment focused on assessing ability to provide consent.

Grisso has also contributed work as both an author and coeditor to a multitude of books and articles. Many publications are focused on juvenile justice such as his known works Youth on Trial and Double Jeopardy. Some of his books include, "Evaluating Juveniles' Adjudicative Competence: A Guide for Clinical Practice" (2005),"Clinical Evaluations for Juveniles' Competence to Stand Trail: A Guide for Legal Professionals" (2005) and "Mental Health Screening and Assessment in Juvenile Justice" (2005).

== Editorial work ==
Grisso is an active author and contributor on the editorial board of a multitude of journals including: Behavioral Sciences and the Law, Law and Human Behavior, and Criminal Justice and Behavior.

== Awards ==
Grisso's work has led him to be recipient of many awards from the American Psychological Association, the American Psychiatric Association, the Royal College of Psychiatrists, the American Psychology-Law Society. Grisso has also been the recipient of international awards. Grisso's leadership was also recognized as the recipient of the Juvenile Law Center Leadership Prize. In 2001, He received a Guttmacher Award for a book on having the most significant contribution to psychiatry and law. He became an Honorary Fellow of the Royal College of Psychiatrists in the United Kingdom in 2006.
