= Boulie Tacker =

Australian unidentified criminal

The Boulie Tacker is the nickname given to the unknown person or persons who, since 2014, has laid furniture tacks on Yarra Boulevard - a road and popular cycling path in Melbourne, Australia.

The tacks puncture bicycle tyres with over 1,000 punctured tyres reported between 2015 and 2020, damaging bicycles and in some cases causing serious injury to cyclists. Road maintenance teams have been required to use special magnetic mats to sweep the road to remove the tacks. The sweepers believe the culprit watches the clean-up, with one stating "A lot of times I finish at 2-2.30pm, he watches me and by 5pm we've got more tacks."

Local cyclists held a protest ride in May 2015 to draw attention to the incidents during which at least one rider rode over a tack and damaged their tyre. Other local cyclists have also staked out the area privately in an attempt to catch the culprit in the act.

There are many theories on the nature of the offender with cyclists believing that it is part of a "vendetta" against cycling on the boulevard. A forensic psychologist stated "They're sending a message, who knows what that message is [...] There is no such thing as random behaviour. People do what they do for reasons, even when those reasons are very irrational". The tacks are distinctive, used by upholsterers and furniture craftsmen, and police have tracked down supply routes without success. Police believe the offender may be dropping the tacks from a car or motorcycle.

Victoria Police released CCTV footage of a person they believed to be the offender with the person in question damaging an informal "puncture repair station" set up along the boulevard to help cyclists falling victim to the attacks. In 2019, the police offered a reward of $50,000 for information leading to the arrest of the offender and installed bluetooth-enabled mobile CCTV camera units. Police state that the culprit when apprehended could be charged with a range of offences "including conduct endangering life, criminal damage and aggravated littering".

After a period of inactivity, the Boulie Tacker returned in 2020 with police continuing to investigate.
