= Adam Fine =

Psychologist

- Occupation: Professor of Psychology

Academic background
- Education: University of California-Irvine

Academic work
- Discipline: Developmental Psychology
- Sub-discipline: Juvenile Justice and Juvenile Delinquency
- Institutions: Arizona State University

Adam Fine is a psychologist whose research predominately focuses on the juvenile justice system and juvenile delinquency. He is a professor in the School of Criminology and Criminal Justice and Director of the Youth Justice Lab at Arizona State University.

== Education ==
Fine received his B.A. in psychology from Georgetown University in 2012. As an undergraduate student, Fine conducted research on the interaction between early childhood education and child welfare, especially within the Maryland Foster Care System Population, through his honors thesis under the mentorship of Dr. Deborah Phillips and Dr. Beth Meloy.

He attended graduate school, at the University of California, Irvine, where he obtained his Masters of Arts in Social Ecology (2015) and Ph.D. in Psychology and Social Behavior with concentrations in Developmental Psychology and Quantitative Methods (2018). His dissertation entitled Respect and Obey: The Development of Adolescents’ Perceptions of the Police and the Law tackled the idea of how a juvenile's perception of legal authorities and the law affects their inclination to break the law. Fine conducted this research under the mentorship of Dr. Elizabeth Cauffman, Dr. Chuansheng Chen, and Dr. Nicholas Scurich.

== Career ==
Following his graduation from the University of California-Irvine, Fine was hired as an assistant professor in the School of Criminology and Criminal Justice at Arizona State University (ASU), and he received tenure and was simultaneously promoted directly to a full Professor in 2024. Fine has been nominated for the Outstanding Doctoral Mentor Award and was a finalist for the Outstanding Master's Mentor Award at Arizona State University. In 2023, Fine was awarded a Faculty Early Career Development (CAREER) grant from the 2023 National Science Foundation, one of the most prestigious awards in support of early-career faculty in the United States. His work was also featured on the HBO program Last Week Tonight with John Oliver, which highlighted national juvenile justice issues.

== Community outreach ==
Fine serves as the director of the Youth Justice Lab at Arizona State University’s School of Criminology and Criminal Justice, which aims to conduct research regarding juvenile justice.

== Research ==
Fine's research focuses mainly on the critical issues with the Juvenile Justice System and juvenile delinquency. His research interests involve the impact of justice system processes on the overall experience of involved youth and how youth and the community develop their perceptions of our legal systems.

Fine, in collaboration with Benjamin Van Rooji, wrote The Behavioral Code: The Hidden Ways Law Makes Us Better or Worse, which looks at the hidden forces and root causes that drive human behavior and our responses to laws set by our society. The book explores the psychological and societal mechanisms that shape how people respond to laws, revealing the often-overlooked behavioral forces that drive compliance or misconduct. Challenging conventional approaches to criminal justice, The Behavioral Code advocates for a shift toward strategies informed by behavioral science, aiming to promote public safety through a deeper understanding of human motivation and systemic context. The book received national recognition for its contribution to public understanding of the law and legal systems. It was named a finalist for the American Bar Association's prestigious 2022 Silver Gavel Award, one of the highest honors for works fostering public awareness of the justice system. It was also a 2022 PROSE Award finalist in Legal Studies and Criminology, an honor bestowed by the Association of American Publishers to recognize exceptional scholarly and professional works. In addition, the authors were awarded the 2023 Lawrence S. Wrightsman Book Award from the American Psychology-Law Society, which is intended to recognize outstanding scholarship in psychology and law.

== Books ==
Van Rooji, B., Fine, A (2022) The Behavioral Code: The Hidden Ways Law Makes Us Better or Worse Beacon Press.
