= Donald N. Bersoff =

American psychologist and lawyer (1939–2024)

- Born: Donald Neil Bersoff; March 1, 1939
- Died: March 26, 2024 (aged 85)
- Education: New York University (BS, MA, PhD); Yale Law School (JD)
- Scientific career
- Fields: Psychology, law

Donald Neil Bersoff (March 1, 1939 – March 26, 2024) was an American psychologist, attorney and academic. He was the president of the American Psychological Association (APA) in 2013. Before being elected president, Bersoff served as APA general counsel and held several leadership positions within the organization. He was a faculty member at several law schools and he developed the nation's second joint graduate program in psychology and law. Bersoff wrote four editions of a popular book on ethics and psychology.

== Life and career ==
Donald Bersoff earned BS, MA and Ph.D degrees from New York University, completing the PhD in 1965. He practiced clinical psychology for several years in the United States Air Force, in private practice and as director of a college counseling center. He was a psychology professor at Ohio State University and the University of Georgia. In 1976, Bersoff graduated from Yale Law School and joined the law school faculties at the University of Maryland and Johns Hopkins University. He led a joint PhD/JD program in psychology and law at Johns Hopkins. From 1979 to 1989, Bersoff provided legal counsel to the APA, first as in-house general counsel and then through the firms of Jenner and Block and Ennis, Friedman and Bersoff. In 1990, he became director of the psychology and law program at Villanova University, where he was an emeritus professor of law.

Bersoff was elected president of the APA in 2013, and he was the first lawyer practitioner to hold the office. He served three terms on the APA Council of Representatives. Bersoff was a past president of the American Psychology-Law Society, a division of the APA, and was also chair of the Law and Mental Disability Section of the Association of American Law Schools. He has written more than 100 publications and has authored all four editions of Ethical Conflicts in Psychology. As APA president, he created the Bersoff Presidential Award to Multicultural Programs to recognize psychology graduate programs that recruit and train ethnic minorities.

Bersoff died on March 26, 2024, at the age of 85.

== Honors and awards ==
- Presidential Citation for Distinguished Service, American Psychological Association
- Lifetime Contribution Award, American Psychology-Law Society
- Ethics Educator of the Year, Pennsylvania Psychological Association

== Publications ==
- Ethical Conflicts in Psychology (4th ed.). American Psychological Association (2008)

== See also ==
- Legal psychology
