= Margaret Bull Kovera =

American social psychologist

- Occupations: Presidential Scholar and Professor of Psychology
- Known for: Eyewitness identification and legal decision making

Academic background
- Education: University of Minnesota; Northwestern University

Academic work
- Discipline: Psychology and Law
- Institutions: John Jay College of Criminal Justice; CUNY Graduate Center
- Website: https://www.margaretkovera.com/

Margaret Bull Kovera is an American social psychologist, legal consultant, and expert on eyewitness identification and legal decision-making. She is often cited as an expert in news articles about jury selection in high-profile criminal cases. Kovera is a Presidential Scholar and Professor of Psychology and at John Jay College of Criminal Justice and the CUNY Graduate Center, where she directs the Legal Decision Making and Witness Behavior laboratory.

Kovera is an elected member of the Board of Directors of the American Psychological Association. She previously served as a member of the American Psychology-Law Society (AP-LS) subcommittee to modernize guidelines for eyewitness identification procedures.

Kovera received the AP-LS Distinguished Contributions to Psychology and Law Award in 2025. Other professional honors include the Distinguished Service to the Society for the Psychological Study of Social Issues (SPSSI) Award (2014), the AP-LS Outstanding Teaching and Mentoring in the Field of Psychology and Law Award (2004), and the AP-LS Saleem Shah Early Career Award (2000).

== Education ==
Kovera received her Bachelor of Arts Degree in Psychology (with departmental honors) from Northwestern University (1984-1988) and her Doctorate in Social Psychology from the University of Minnesota (1988-1994). As a graduate student working with Eugene Borgida, Kovera focused mainly on child's capabilities as witnesses in child sexual abuse trials.

Kovera taught at Florida International University (1995-2004) before joining the faculty of John Jay College of Criminal Justice (CUNY) in 2004. Kovera's research has been generously supported by the National Science Foundation.

== Research ==
Kovera's research examines the assumptions the legal system makes about the behavior of "legal actors", such as attorneys, police officers, jurors, judges, and witnesses. She has conducted work on varied topics in the field of psychology and law including expert witnesses, eyewitness identification, and jury selection. As examples, her team has explored factors that affect judges’ abilities to distinguish between legitimate and junk science, and the effectiveness of procedural safeguards against junk science. Other work investigated adversarial allegiance––expert witnesses' propensity to assess the evidence in a way which benefits the party that hired them––and potential strategies for mitigating this bias.

Kovera and her collaborators have studied eyewitness identification procedures and the advantages of using double-blind lineups, where the lineup administrator is blind to the identification of the suspect. In other work, her team has examined how social psychological processes may affect jury verdicts. Such psychological processes include attitudes and beliefs, confirmation bias, and implicit racial bias.

== Books ==
- Cutler, B. L., & Kovera, M. B. (2010). Evaluating eyewitness identification. Oxford University Press. ISBN 978-0-19-537268-7
- Bottoms, B. L., Kovera, M. B., & McAuliff, B. D. (Eds.) (2002). Children, social science, and the law. Cambridge University Press.
- Kovera, M. B. (Ed). (2017). The psychology of juries. American Psychological Association. ISBN 978-1-4338-2704-4
- Kovera, M. B. & Cutler, B. L. (2013). Jury selection. Oxford University Press. ISBN 978-0-19-532301-6

== Representative publications ==
- Kovera, M. B. (2002). The effects of general pretrial publicity on juror decisions: An examination of moderators and mediating mechanisms. Law and Human Behavior, 26(1), 43-72.
- Kovera, M. B. (2019). Racial disparities in the criminal justice system: Prevalence, causes, and a search for solutions. Journal of Social Issues, 75(4), 1139-1164.
- Kovera, M. B. (2024). The role of suspect development practices in eyewitness identification accuracy and racial disparities in wrongful conviction. Social Issues and Policy Review, 18(1), 125-147.
- Kovera, M. B., & McAuliff, B. D. (2000). The effects of peer review and evidence quality on judge evaluations of psychological science: Are judges effective gatekeepers? Journal of Applied Psychology, 85(4), 574-586.
- Kovera, M. B., Gresham, A. W., Borgida, E., Gray, E., & Regan, P. C. (1997). Does expert psychological testimony inform or influence juror decision making? A social cognitive analysis. Journal of Applied Psychology, 82(1), 178-191.
