= Jennifer Skeem =

American psychologist

Jennifer L. Skeem
- Education: University of Utah
- Awards: 2012 Daniel Stokols Faculty Award for Interdisciplinary Research from the University of California, Irvine, fellow of the Association for Psychological Science since 2013
- Scientific career
- Fields: Forensic psychology
- Workplaces: University of California, Berkeley
- Thesis: Understanding Juror Decision Making and Bias in Insanity Defense Cases: The Role of Lay Conceptions and Case-relevant Attitudes (1999)

Jennifer Lynne Skeem is an American psychologist and the Mack Distinguished Professor in the UC Berkeley School of Social Welfare, where she is also the Associate Dean of Research. She is also a professor at the University of California, Berkeley's Goldman School of Public Policy. Her research focuses on criminal justice and behavioral science, including how to improve the ways that the criminal justice system treats people with mental illness. From 2013 to 2014, she was the president of the American Psychology-Law Society. Since 2013, she has been a fellow of the Association for Psychological Science.

== Accomplishments ==
Jennifer Skeem has assisted in editing over 150 articles and books, including the award- winning academic book, "Using Social Science to Reduce Violent Offending."
