= Steve Penrod =

American professor of psychology

Steve Penrod is an American educator. He currently serves as a distinguished professor of psychology at the John Jay College of Criminal Justice. His education and career have led him to become an expert in the areas of psychology and law. He has contributed heavily to the field of psychology in the area of eyewitness memory, specifically the accuracy of eyewitness identification.

== Biography ==
=== Education ===
Penrod received his B.A. in political science at Yale College in 1969, where he was involved with the Yale Political Union. Penrod studied at Harvard Law School and received his J.D. in 1974. In 1979, he received a Ph.D. in Social Psychology from Harvard. His dissertation was titled, Evaluation of social scientific and traditional attorney methods of jury selection.

=== Professional experience ===
From 1971 to 1973, Penrod worked as a Legal Officer in the Judge Advocate General's Corps, U.S. Navy. In 1979, he became a professor of psychology at the University of Wisconsin. In 1989, Penrod became a professor of law and an adjunct professor of psychology at the University of Minnesota. In 1995 Penrod moved to the University of Nebraska–Lincoln, where he was a professor of psychology and law and the program director for the law and psychology programs. In 2001 Penrod became a distinguished professor of psychology at John Jay.

=== Honors and awards ===
==== Yale College ====
- Pi Sigma Alpha Political Science Honor Society
- National Science Foundation Summer Research Grant
- Griffin Scholarship
- Alcoa Scholarship

==== Harvard Law School ====
- Taft Scholarship

==== Harvard University ====
- National Science Foundation Dissertation
- Research Grand Law and Social Sciences

==== Post-educational ====
- 1980 — Co-winner of Society for the Psychological Study of Social Issues
- 1980 — Society for Experimental Social Psychology Dissertation Award.
- 1980 — Cattell Dissertation Award, New York Academy of Sciences
- 1981 — Second Prize American Psychological Association Division 13 Meltzer Research Award
- 1986 — American Psychological Association Distinguished Scientific Award for an Early Career Contribution to Applied Psychology (Citation: American Psychologist, 42, 300–303).
- 1994-1995 — Davis Professorship in Law, University of Minnesota
- 1999-2000 — Gallup Professorship — University of Nebraska–Lincoln
- 1999 — Award for Distinguished Contributions to Psychology and the Law — American Psychology–Law Society
- 2001 — Distinguished Professorship, John Jay College, CUNY

== Work and studies ==
Most of Penrod's work has dealt with eyewitness studies. In one of his most commonly cited articles (according to Harzing), "Eyewitness Identification Procedures: Recommendations for Lineups and Photospreads," he discusses the topic of eyewitness identification and recommends different techniques to help lower the chances of false identification. Examples of these include double-blind lineups, informing witnesses that the suspect may not even be present in the lineup, and choosing distractors carefully based on the witness's verbal description.

Another Penrod study, "Meta-analysis of facial identification studies" focuses on discovering what variables influence facial identification performance and what aspects of this topic should be further studied. Some variables that were found to affect performance were context reinstatement, target distinctiveness, elaboration at encoding, exposure time, cross-racial identification, and retention interval.

Penrod also did a study, "Choosing, confidence, and accuracy: A meta-analysis of the confidence-accuracy relation in eyewitness identification studies," which deals with confidence of eyewitnesses. This study sought to discover the strength of correlation between confidence and accuracy for eyewitness identifying a suspect. It found that those who identified the correct suspect tended to have higher confidence levels than those who were incorrect.
