= Jennifer Woolard =

Developmental psychologist

- Occupations: Professor of Psychology and Adjunct Professor of Law
- Awards: Dean’s Award for Teaching Excellence

Academic background
- Education: University of Virginia
- Website: http://jenwoolard.com/

Jennifer Woolard is a developmental psychologist known for work within the juvenile justice system. Woolard is professor of psychology and adjunct professor of law at Georgetown University. She is involved in the Youth In Custody Practice Model Initiative at the Center for Juvenile Justice Reform at Georgetown University's McCourt School of Public Policy, which seeks to adopt evidence-based developmentally-appropriate practices within juvenile correctional institutions.

Woolard served as president of the American Psychology–Law Society in 2016. She is co-author of the book Preventing Child Abuse and Neglect Through Parent Education.

== Biography ==
Woolard received her doctoral degree in developmental and community psychology at the University of Virginia in 1998. Her dissertation titled "Developmental aspects of judgment and competence in legally relevant contexts" was completed under the supervision of N. Dickon Reppucci.

Post-graduation, Woolard served a staff member to the Virginia Commission on Family Violence Prevention and was a consultant with Virginians Against Domestic Violence.

Woolard was a member of the faculty of the University of Florida Center for Studies in Criminology and Law before joining the faculty Psychology Department at Georgetown University in 2002. While at Georgetown, Woolard was recipient of the College Dean's Award for Teaching Excellence. She has served as a member of the MacArthur Foundation Research Network on Adolescent Development and Juvenile Justice.

Woolard is Principal Investigator of the Georgetown Community Research Group, which focuses on systems of care and control as in criminal justice and school systems. Her research group aims to understand how teens and their parents negotiate and work within these systems. The researchers have sought to understand how young people perceive their legal rights, such as the right to a trial, the right to an attorney, the right to remain silent, and the role of the defense, with the aim of informing judicial policies and establishing fair and just legal processes for youth. Woolard and her team have conducted research within juvenile correctional facilities, documenting inverse relationships between rates of family visitation and youth behavioral problems, and studying possible barrier to family contact. Other studies have examined parental perceptions of juvenile probation procedures and interactions with probation officers.

In 2015, Woolard launched a three-year program titled Project Cohort with the goal of providing extensive mental health resources for veterans and potentially reduce the suicide rates of veterans across by targeting post-traumatic stress disorder.

== Representative work ==
- Vidal, S., & Woolard, J. (2016). Parents' perceptions of juvenile probation: Relationship and interaction with juvenile probation officers, parent strategies, and youth's compliance on probation. Children and Youth Services Review, 66, 1–8.
- Woolard, J. L., Cleary, H. M., Harvell, S. A., & Chen, R. (2008). Examining adolescents’ and their parents’ conceptual and practical knowledge of police interrogation: A family dyad approach. Journal of Youth and Adolescence, 37(6), 685–698.
- Woolard, J. L., Harvell, MPP, S., & Graham, Ph.D., S. (2008). Anticipatory injustice among adolescents: Age and racial/ethnic differences in perceived unfairness of the justice system. Behavioral Sciences & the Law, 26(2), 207–226.
- Woolard, J. L., Odgers, C., Lanza-Kaduce, L., & Daglis, H. (2005). Juveniles within adult correctional settings: Legal pathways and developmental considerations. International Journal of Forensic Mental Health, 4(1), 1–18.
- Woolard, J. L., Vidal, S., & Fountain, E. (2015). Juvenile offenders. In B. L. Cutler & P. A. Zapf (Eds.), APA handbook of forensic psychology, Vol. 2. Criminal investigation, adjudication, and sentencing outcomes (p. 33–58). American Psychological Association.
