= Florence Kaslow =

American psychologist

Florence Kaslow is an American psychologist. In addition to studying and instructing psychology she also practices. She served as the president of Div. 43 (Society for Family Psychology), Div. 46 (Media Psychology and Technology) and co-chair of APA's Committee on International Relations in Psychology. She also served as chair of the Family Psychology Specialty Council, which helps to boost membership and establish research as an important component of div. 43.

Her contributions to psychology are numerous, as she has helped to found several other groups such as the American Board of Forensic Psychology, APA Division of Family Psychology, American Board of Family Psychology, International Family Therapy Association. She earned a PhD from Bryn Mawr College and spent years teaching graduate students and medical school courses in clinical, couple and family, and forensic psychology.

She has received degrees from Temple (Bachelor's degree), Ohio State (Master's degree) and Bryn Mawr (Doctoral degree). During college she started volunteering to work in several international student programs related to counseling and peer mentoring; she continued this throughout her educational career.

== Career ==
She has had an influence in the field of family psychology, as she has been a part of it for many years and written many documents and articles directly related to couple and family psychology. Also known as a life coach, she has been cited as an expert in many psychological articles. During her time at Hahnnemann University, she was a professor and advised international students. She was the initial director of one of the first combined Ph.D. and J.D program at Hahnemann Medical School.

She has published over 30 books and close to 200 articles.

== Contributions to psychology ==
She is the author or editor of over 30 professional books. Contributor of chapters to over 60 other books. She Has had over 110 articles published in professional journals. She currently (2022) does therapy, consulting, coaching and presents workshops throughout the country. Kaslow has been awarded a variety of honors, including the American Psychological Association's Distinguished Contribution to Applied Psychology in 1990.
