= Michael J. Saks =

American legal scholar

Michael J. Saks is a professor of law at the Sandra Day O'Connor College of Law at Arizona State University; he holds a secondary appointment in the department of psychology.

Saks served as president of the American Psychology-Law Society and as editor of the scientific journal, Law and Human Behavior. For his early work on jury research, he earned the Award for Distinguished Contribution to Psychology in the Public Interest from the American Psychological Association.

Saks's primary area of expertise is in the Law and Social Science field, in which he is the fourth most cited current scholar. He has authored over 200 articles and book chapters, and is co-editor of the book series, Modern Scientific Evidence.

Saks holds a B.A. from Pennsylvania State University, a M.S.L. from Yale Law School, and a Ph.D. in Social Psychology from Ohio State University. Prior to his appointment at Arizona State, he was on the faculty at the University of Iowa, Georgetown University, and Boston College.

Saks got together with Barbara Spellman in 2016 to write a book called "The Psychological Foundations of Evidence Law".

== Contribution to social psychology ==
Michael J. Saks has been an influential figure in the field of social psychology and has been recognized for his contributions to improving jury functioning. In 1976, the Supreme Court considered the monumental case (Williams v. Florida) in which Williams attempted to have his conviction overturned on the grounds that the jury consisted of only six individuals. The Supreme Court ruled that a jury of six individuals is large enough to fulfill the roles and duties of a jury while representing the community accurately. It was presumed that a jury of six was sufficient to protect its members and promote adequate group deliberation. Saks suggested that the Supreme Court should have considered aspects of Group dynamics when making this decision. He explained that modifying jury size is likely to influence:

1. Group Structure: Smaller Juries are more cohesive and individuals tend to participate at more equal rates. Members of larger juries on the other hand, exchange more information.

2. Representativeness: Saks concluded that smaller juries were not as representative as larger juries. That is, if a community was 10% Latino and 90% Anglo, it is probable that approximately 80% of 12 member juries would include at least one Latino member, while only 40% of 6 member juries would consist of any Latinos.

3. Majority Influence: The influence of a majority is more likely in smaller juries, while the influence of a minority would be more likely in a larger group as dissenters are more likely to find at least one other who shares their opinion.

Saks disputed that a common error inferred by the Court was the assumption that a 5 to 1 vote in a 6-person jury was equivalent to a 10–2 split in a 12-person jury. In the situation of the 10 to 2 vote, the dissenting individual would be accompanied by a partner while in the 5 to 1 vote he or she faces the majority alone. Considering this phenomenon, Saks concluded that likelihood of a hung jury is more likely in larger-sized juries.
