= Ronald Roesch =

Canadian professor of psychology (born 1947)

Ronald Roesch (born 1947) is Emeritus Professor of Psychology at Simon Fraser University in British Columbia, Canada.

== Biography and education ==
Ron Roesch is an American and Canadian forensic psychologist. He was born in 1947 in Montclair, New Jersey but moved with his family to Phoenix, Arizona when he was 15. He received a Bachelor of Science degree in psychology in 1971 from Arizona State University. From 1972 to 1977, he attended the University of Illinois at Urbana-Champaign, where he received his PhD in clinical psychology. While at UI he focused his training on community psychology, mentored by Edward Seidman and Julian Rappaport. His dissertation was titled “Competency to Stand Trial: An Analysis of Legal/Mental Health Issues and Procedures and a Proposal for Change.” Following completion of his PhD in 1977 he accepted a faculty position at Simon Fraser University (SFU) in British Columbia, Canada. He was promoted to Full Professor in 1985 and served terms as Director of the Criminology Research Centre, Director of Clinial Training, and Founding Director of the Mental Health, Law, & Policy Institurte. He retired in 2023 and currently holds an appointment at SFU as Emeritus Professor.

Roesch's primary research focuses on the assessment of a criminal defendant's competence (fitness) to stand trial. His 1980 book, co-authored with Stephen Golding, was one of the first academic books on this topic. The Roesch-Golding competency assessment model rejects competency standards based primarily on traditional psychiatric assessment and instead views competency from a functional perspective in which a defendant's cognitive, behavioral, and affective capacities are evaluated relative to the legal demands of a defendant's criminal case. After his move to Canada to accept a position at SFU, Roesch authored, with colleagues Christopher Webster and Derek Eaves, the Fitness Interview Test to guide interviewers assessing fitness to stand trial. It was subsequently revised and published with both Canadian and United States versions. It has been translated into French, Italian, and Spanish. Roesch has also conducted research on jail mental health evaluations and co-authored the Jail Screening Assessment Tool, a brief mental health screening instrument to assess pretrial inmates.

SFU's Mental Health, Law, and Policy Institute, which was directed by Roesch since it was founded in 1991, is recognized as a world leader in the forensic assessment of risk for violence, stalking, jail mental health, and sexual violence. It has published forensic assessment instruments on these topics, and many of the instruments have been translated and are used in countries throughout the world.

== Publications ==
Roesch has authored over 180 articles and book chapters, and 15 books on his research on competency to stand trial, criminal responsibility, jail mental health assessment and interventions, risk assessment of young offenders, and the capacity of young offenders to understand and waive arrest rights. He collaborated with Patricia Zapf to write a book for forensic clinicians to apply best practices in assessments of competency to stand trial, and their book written for lawyers to help them make effective use of psychological expertise in forensic assessments of their clients won the 2016 American Psychology-Law Society Book Award.

== Advocacy ==
Roesch was surprised to learn after moving to Canada that Canadian psychologists were not allowed to independently conduct evaluations of fitness to stand trial or criminal responsibility, as the Canadian Criminal Code specifies that they must be done by medical practitioners. He has been advocating for changes to the law since 2002 when he testified before a Canadian Parliamentary committee examining changes to the Mental Health provisions of the Canadian Criminal Code. He has been frustrated by the slow progress, but was encouraged when in 2017, he and a number of his Canadian colleagues were appointed to a Task Force by the Canadian Psychological Association to develop a strategy to change this law and have subsequently published an article summarizing the rationale and empirical basis for this change. The Task Force continues to press the legislature to change the law.

== Achievements and recognition ==
Roesch was elected president of the American Psychology-Law Society (1993–94), and president of the International Association of Forensic Mental Health Services (2009–11). He has served as editor of the leading journals in his field: Law and Human Behavior (1988–96), International Journal of Forensic Mental Health (2002-2006), and Psychology, Public Policy, and Law (2008-2012). He was editor of the American Psychology-Law Society book series published by Oxford University Press, and the International Perspectives on Forensic Mental Health book series published by Routledge. Roesch was elected Fellow of both the Canadian Psychological Association and the American Psychological Association. His research and other contributions to the field of psychology and law have been recognized with a number of awards:

- Distinguished Contribution to Forensic Psychology Award (2024) from the American Academy of Forensic Psychology.
- Don Andrews Career Contribution Award (2022) from the Criminal Justice Section of the Canadian Psychological Association for “a corpus of work accrued that makes a significant contribution to our theoretical understanding and/or practices in criminal justice psychology and/or law.”
- Rüdiger Müller-Isberner Award (2019) from the International Association of Forensic Mental Health Services. The award is given annually to “a long-standing member of the association whose career epitomizes the fusion of clinical practice, scholarly research, and mentorship.”
- Canadian Psychological Association John C. Service Member of the Year Award (2018). This award was given to Roesch and other members of the CPA Criminal Justice Taskforce for developing a position paper for the CPA on the assessment of fitness to stand trial and criminal responsibility. The position paper was submitted to the federal government to advocate for changes to the Criminal Code to allow for a greater role for psychologists in these assessments. An article version of this report was published in Canadian Psychology.
- Dean's Medal for Academic Excellence, Faculty of Arts and Social Sciences, Simon Fraser University (2016).
- Lawrence S. Wrightsman Book Award (2016) from the American Psychology-Law Society, for the book Forensic Assessments in Criminal and Civil Law: A Handbook for Lawyers (edited with P. A. Zapf).
- Lifetime Achievement Award for Contributions to Psychology and Law (2011), from the European Association of Psychology & Law.
- Distinguished Contributions to Psychology and Law Award (2010), from the American Psychology-Law Society. The award “honors one who has made distinguished theoretical, empirical and/or applied contributions to the field of psychology and law.”
- Outstanding Teaching and Mentoring in the Field of Psychology and Law Award (2009), from the American Psychology-Law Society. The award “recognizes teaching excellence in a variety of contexts.”
- Certificate of Merit, American Bar Association Gavel Awards Competition (1982), for the book Competency to Stand Trial (with S. L. Golding).
- Social Issues Dissertation Award (1977) from the Society for the Psychological Studies of Social Issues, American Psychological Association, Division 9. Award was for “the best psychological dissertation concerned with social issues.”
- J. Watson Wilson Consulting Psychology Research Award (1977), from the American Psychological Association, Division 13. Award was for “the most fruitful research of the year related to consultation.”
