= Psychology, Public Policy, and Law =

- Discipline: Psychology, Forensic psychology, Legal psychology, Law
- Language: English
- Edited by: Tess M.S. Neal

Publication details
- History: 1995–present
- Publisher: American Psychological Association (United States)
- Frequency: Quarterly
- Impact factor: 2.0 (2024)

Standard abbreviations
- Bluebook: Psychol. Pub. Pol'y & L.
- ISO 4: Psychol. Public Policy Law

Indexing
- ISSN: 1076-8971 (print); 1939-1528 (web)
- LCCN: 95658604
- OCLC no.: 635218700

Links
- Journal homepage; Online access

Psychology, Public Policy, and Law is a quarterly peer-reviewed academic journal published by the American Psychological Association. It publishes original empirical papers, reviews, and meta-analyses on the contribution of psychological science to law and public policy.

The journal has implemented the Transparency and Openness Promotion (TOP) Guidelines. The TOP Guidelines provide structure to research planning and reporting and aim to make research more transparent, accessible, and reproducible.

== Abstracting and indexing ==
PPPL is abstracted and indexed by Criminal Justice Abstracts, Current Contents, Family Index, PsycINFO, PubMed, Scopus, and the Social Sciences Citation Index. According to the Journal Citation Reports, the journal has a 2024 impact factor of 2.0.

== Editors ==
The following persons are or have been editors-in-chief of this journal:

- Tess M.S. Neal, (2025-present) Iowa State University
- Michael Lamb, (2013–2024) University of Cambridge
- Ronald Roesch, (2008–2012) Simon Fraser University
- Steven Penrod, (2007) John Jay College of Criminal Justice
- Jane Goodman-Delahunty, (2001-2006) Charles Sturt University
- Bruce Sales, (1995-2000) University of Arizona
