= John Monahan (law professor) =

John Monahan holds the John S. Shannon Professorship in Law, and joined the University of Virginia Law School faculty in 1980. He originally trained as a psychologist. Monahan has led two large projects in mental health law, supported by the MacArthur Foundation.

Monahan has written 15 books and more than 200 articles and chapters. The book Social Science in Law is entering its seventh edition. Two other books have won Awards from the American Psychiatric Association: The Clinical Prediction of Violent Behavior published in 1982 and Rethinking Risk Assessment (2002). Monahan's research has been frequently cited by the law courts.

== Books ==
- Coercive Treatment in Psychiatry: Clinical, Legal and Ethical Aspects, (editor with Thomas W. Kallert and Juan E. Mezzich) (Wiley-Blackwell, 2011).
- Social Science in Law: Cases and Materials, (with Laurens Walker) (Foundation Press, 7th ed. 2010).
- An Introduction to Social Science in Law, (with Laurens Walker) (Foundation Press, 2006).
- Social Science in Law: Cases and Materials, (with Laurens Walker) (Foundation Press, 6th ed. 2006).
- Adjudicative Competence: The MacArthur Studies, (with others) (Kluwer Academic/Plenum Publishers, 2002).
- Social Science in Law: Cases and Materials, (with Laurens Walker) (Foundation Press, 1985; 2d ed. 1990; 3d ed. 1994; 4th ed. 1998; 5th ed. 2002).
- Rethinking Risk Assessment: The MacArthur Study of Mental Disorder and Violence, (with others) (Oxford U. Press, 2001).
- Research in Community and Mental Health, Vol. 10: Coercion in Mental Health Services – International Perspectives (ed. with J. Morrissey) (Connecticut: JAI Press, 1999).
- Mental Disorder, Work Disability, and the Law, (ed. with Richard J. Bonnie) (U. of Chicago Press, 1997).
- Coercion and Aggressive Community Treatment: A New Frontier in Mental Health Law, (ed. with Deborah L. Dennis) (Plenum Press, 1996).
- Violence and Mental Disorder: Developments in Risk Assessment, (ed. with Henry J. Steadman) (U. of Chicago Press, 1994).
- Children, Mental Health, and the Law, (ed. with N. Dickon Reppucci, Lois A. Weithorn, and Edward P. Mulvey) (Sage Publications, 1984).
- Mentally Disordered Offenders: Perspectives from Law and Social Science, (ed. with Henry J. Steadman) (Plenum Press, 1983).
- The Clinical Prediction of Violent Behavior, (National Institute of Mental Health, 1981). Reprinted as Predicting Violent Behavior: An Assessment of Clinical Techniques (Sage Publications, 1981). Excerpts reprinted in 1 Violent Behavior 125–150, 259–279 (Leonard J. Hertzberg et al., eds.) (PMA Publishing, 1990).
- Who Is the Client? The Ethics of Psychological Intervention in the Criminal Justice System, (editor) (American Psychological Association, 1980).
- Prevention in Mental Health: Research, Policy and Practice, (ed. with Richard H. Price, Richard F. Ketterer & Barbara C. Bader) (Sage Publications, 1980).

== See also ==
- Elyn Saks
- Stuart A. Kirk
- Brent Robbins
