= Stephen L. Golding =

Stephen L. Golding (born 1944) is an emeritus professor of psychology at the University of Utah and a forensic psychologist who has written a large number of articles on the process of determining whether people are competent to stand trial.

Golding has a BA from the University of Arizona and a Ph.D. from the University of Oregon. He was a professor at the University of Illinois at Urbana-Champaign from 1970–1985 and from 1985-2006 was a professor at the University of Utah. He did post-doctoral research at UCLA and was a visiting professor at the University of South Florida.

Golding was a witness for the defense in Brian David Mitchell's federal competency hearing, arguing that Mitchell was delusional and wanted to be convicted making him unable to assist in his own defense.

== Sources ==
- Golding's vita
