= Vivien Zapf =

Researcher at Los Alamos National Laboratory

Vivien Zapf is an American research scientist at the National High Magnetic Field Laboratory pulsed field facility at Los Alamos National Laboratory.

== Biography ==
Zapf received her bachelor's degree in physics with computer science from Harvey Mudd College in 1997 and a Ph.D. in physics from the University of California, San Diego in 2003. Zapf studies Multiferrics and Quantum Magnetism. She served as a Millikan post-doctoral fellow at the California Institute of Technology from 2004-2005 and as a Director's fellow at Los Alamos National Laboratory from 2005-2006.

She received a Los Alamos National Laboratory Distinguished Performance Award and a Lee-Osheroff-Richardson prize. In 2017, she was elected as a Fellow of the American Physical Society for "seminal contributions to the understanding of quantum mechanical properties of superconductors, quantum magnets, and multiferroic systems at low temperatures and in extreme magnetic fields to 100T" and an outstanding referee award from the American Physical Society in 2019.

She serves as the deputy director of the Quantum Science Center, a United States Department of Energy-funded research effort which encompasses approximately 17 institutions solving problems in the field of Quantum Information Science. She also serves as a thrust leader and on the management committee at the Center for Molecular Magnetic Quantum Materials, a United States Department of Energy-funded Energy Frontier Research Center led by the University of Florida. She is also the chair line of the executive committee of the American Physical Society Division of Materials Physics, which was established in 1984 to apply "fundamental condensed matter concepts to complex and multiphase media, including materials of technological interest."
