= Legal psychology =

Psychological research of the law

Legal psychology is a field focused on the application of psychological principles within the legal system and its interactions with individuals. Professionals in this area are involved in understanding, assessing, evaluating potential jurors, investigating crimes and crime scenes, conducting forensic investigations The term "legal psychology" distinguishes this practical branch of psychology from the more theory-oriented field of clinical psychology.

Together, legal psychology and forensic psychology form the field more generally recognized as "psychology and law". Following earlier efforts by psychologists to address legal issues, psychology and law became a field of study in the 1960s, though that originating concern has lessened over time. The multidisciplinary American Psychological Association's Division 41, the American Psychology–Law Society, is active with the goal of promoting the contributions of psychology to the understanding of law and legal systems through research; as well as providing education to psychologists in legal issues and providing education to legal personnel on psychological issues. Further, its mandate is to inform the psychological and legal communities, along with the general public, about current research, education, and services in the field of psychology and law. There are similar societies in Canada, Britain, and Europe.

The Canadian Psychological Association also serves as a multidisciplinary hub for psychologists and researchers to connect. Its annual conferences, held across Canada, promote new research and foster collaboration.

Legal psychologists typically earn between $33,891 to $121,931 annually. Salaries range depending on the sector of employment with most entry-level positions for individuals with a doctoral degree starting $60,000-$70,000/annually. Salaries for those with a Bachelor's Degree or Master's Degree typically start at $35,000-$40,000.

== Training and education ==
Legal psychologists typically hold a PhD in some area of psychology (e.g., clinical psychology, social psychology, or cognitive psychology), and apply their knowledge of that field to the law. Although formal legal training (such as a JD or Master of Legal Studies degree) can be beneficial, most legal psychologists hold only the PhD. Based on the annual updates to the American Psychology and Law Society’s (APLS) official resources, there has been an increase in the number of universities which offer specialized training in legal psychology. Additionally, students typically pursue an educational path focusing on psychology, criminology, and forensics in their undergraduate studies. Students may earn a Bachelor's Degree in Psychology, Criminology, or Criminal Justice.

After completing the appropriate education with training and experience, these psychologist are eligible to apply for board certification from the American Board of Professional Psychology (ABPP). This is typically required for most positions in the field.

== Legal vs. forensic psychology ==
For a time, all areas of law which applied psychological information were generally considered under the umbrella of legal psychology. Over time the field expanded so much that different areas of legal psychology had to be defined. Now, legal psychology is considered to refer to the application of research to law enforcement and the justice system to inform its officers of new research, to develop more evidence-based procedures, and to conduct quality assessments of offender programs.

Forensic psychology has developed into its own field which focuses on the offenders and victims of the crime in question. Traditionally, forensic psychology is based in clinical psychology and focuses on the assessment of mental illness, competency, and Not Criminally Responsible on Account of Mental Disorder (NCRMD)/insanity defense. It has been thought that in America psychologists have been used as expert witnesses in court testimonies since the early 1920s. However, it was expected that only a medical doctor would have the expertise to assess and diagnose an individual with incompetency to stand trial or accept a sentence. While the field has widened, this is still generally the case.

Forensic psychological studies in the social psychological explanations for crime and offender motivations have led to the development of (evidence-based) offender profiling. The profiling of criminals, and its application, are not new concepts. Since the 1700s the studies of phrenology have attempted to track physical or behavioural actions to brain functioning and personality traits. This practice was very popular (despite its flaws and racist tendencies) and remains popular as shown by its presence in media, (i.e., tv shows like Criminal minds). The benefit of evidence-based practices helps ensure that bias and interpersonal connections do not influence whom law enforcement views as a threat to community safety.

Recent academic programs for legal psychology have combined the application of research to existing structures and moved away from only allowing clinical psychologists to speak as experts in forensic psychological matters as researchers have also become experts in their fields.

== Areas of research ==
Any research that combines psychological principles with legal applications or contexts could be considered legal psychology.

Common areas of research in legal psychology include (but are not limited to),

1. Understanding Jury decision making
2. Understanding Judges’ decision making
3. Testing the validity of eyewitness statements and identifications
4. Understanding the motivations and obstacles faced by offenders
5. Understanding how an offender reacts psychologically to law enforcement and incarceration
6. Testing the efficacy of treatment programs
7. The use of testimonies made by children
  1. How influenced are children’s testimonies by external forces? (ie., coaching)

These areas of legal interest are supported by general psychological research into,

1. The decision-making skills of adults, individually or in groups
2. Human perceptions and memory under stress
3. Recollection of memories over time
4. Peer pressure, group dynamics, and community expectations
5. Adult psychology
6. Assessment of program quality and post-release behaviour
7. Developmental psychology

The connection between the original psychology research and its use in the justice system is important to remember lest experts develop tunnel vision. For instance, to understand eyewitness memory, a psychologist should be concerned with memory processes as a whole, instead of only the aspects relevant to the law (e.g., lineups, accuracy of testimony). To understand false confessions, a psychologist should be familiar with research on decision making, compliance, obedience, persuasion, and other forms of social influence.

For a time, legal psychology researchers were primarily focused on issues related to eyewitness testimony and jury decision-making—so much so that the editor of Law and Human Behavior, a leading legal psychology journal, implored researchers to expand the scope of their research and move on to other areas.

=== Legal psychology journals and associations ===
There are several legal psychology journals, including Law and Human Behavior, Psychology, Public Policy and Law, Psychology, Crime & Law, and Journal of Psychiatry, Psychology and Law that focus on general topics of criminology, and the criminal justice system. In addition, research by legal psychologists is regularly published in more general journals that cover both basic and applied research areas. The Online Jury Research Update (OJRU) regularly summarizes legal psychology research about legal persuasion, jury research and trial advocacy.

== Roles of a legal psychologist ==
=== Academics and research ===
Many legal psychologists work as professors in university psychology departments, criminal justice departments or law schools. Like other professors, legal psychologists generally conduct and publish empirical research, teach various classes, and mentor graduate and undergraduate students. Many legal psychologists also conduct research in a more general area of psychology (e.g., social, clinical, cognitive) with only a tangential legal focus. Those legal psychologists who work in law schools almost always hold a JD in addition to a PhD.

Academics and researchers make up a significant amount of the psychologists involved today with applying psychology to legal contexts. While many think of clinical psychology as the main form of psychology in the law, however the utility of psychology, including applications of social, developmental, and neurological psychology has given significant amount of evidence-based methods to support a fair, proper, and humane justice system.

The application of psychological knowledge and principles of evidence-based care are significant to maintaining fairness and integrity across the criminal justice system.

=== Amicus briefs ===
One method that psychologists and researchers use to provide best practices to the justice system is through amicus briefs (defined by the Cambridge Dictionary as “a legal document supplied to a court of law containing advice or information relating to a case from a person or organization that is not directly involved in the case”. Psychologists can provide an amicus brief to the court. The amicus brief usually contains an opinion backed by scientific citations and statistics. The American Psychological Association has provided briefs concerning mental illness, intellectual or physical disability, and other factors. The rise in qualitative research methods has allowed these briefs to be more detailed with thorough explanations, compared to many of the older briefs which are based completely on statistics.

=== Advisory roles ===
Legal psychologists may hold advisory roles in court systems. They may advise legal decision makers, particularly judges, on psychological findings pertaining to issues in a case. The psychologist who acts as a court adviser provides similar input to one acting as an expert witness, but acts out of the domain of an adversarial system.

=== Juror selection ===
Juror selection is an area in which legal psychology is often used. Lawyers might use evidence-based methods of questioning, or might hire psychologists to review the jurors themselves. Psychologists working as consultants work on all stages of a case from helping to organize testimony, preparing witnesses to testify, picking juries, and even arranging "shadow jurors" to watch the trial unfold and provide input on the trial.

=== Policy making and legislative guidance ===
Psychologists employed at public policy centers may attempt to influence legislative policy or may be called upon by state (or national) lawmakers to address some policy issue through empirical research. A psychologist working in public policy might suggest laws or help to evaluate a new legal practice (e.g., eyewitness lineups).

=== Expert witnesses ===
Psychologists are often called to be expert witnesses in the courtroom. They lend their professional perspective on the case, the validity of specific evidence, or the psychological state of an accused. Psychologists first entered the courtroom as clinicians to assist the court in determining the mental fitness of an accused. The process to ascertain whether they are capable of understanding the situation they are in, the questions being asked, and the consequences of the trial. This information can only be assessed by a trained and experienced clinical psychologist and is necessary to determine if someone is ‘mentally fit’ to stand trial. This area, however, is typically covered under the area of clinical forensic psychology.

However, outside of the clinical realm, psychologists specifically trained in legal issues, as well as those with no formal training, are often called by legal parties to testify as expert witnesses. In criminal trials, an expert witness may be called to testify about eyewitness memory, mistaken identity, competence to stand trial, the propensity of a death-qualified jury to also be "pro-guilt", etc. Psychologists who focus on clinical issues often testify specifically about a defendant's competence, intelligence, etc. More general testimony about perceptual issues (e.g., adequacy of police sirens) may also come up in trial.

Experts, particularly psychology experts, are often accused of being "hired guns” who will testify to support their ‘side’. While it is possible that this happens, it is against the ethics code and standard of providing honest testimony. It can be problematic if both sides have psychological witnesses, jurors may have the daunting task of assessing difficult scientific information.

Clinicians and researchers in psychology also provide testimony to support or refute evidence based on their experience. There are a range of topics which psychology has relevant research to contribute. The validity of eyewitness testimony is a prime example as legal psychologists have played significant roles in the understanding of the validity and reliability of eyewitness testimony as an investigative tool. Legal psychologists have also aided significantly in the creation of new knowledge and tools to combat the weaknesses of eyewitness recollection.

== Example of legal psychology in action ==
One of the earliest experiments on eyewitness reliability was conducted in March 1893 J. McKeen Cattell posted questions to fifty-six of his students at Columbia University. The questions he asked his students were comparable to those asked in a court of justice. What he found was that it was reasonable to conclude eyewitness accounts of events were unreliable. His students were all sure they were mostly correct, even when they were not, and some were hesitant when they were in fact correct. He could not figure out specifically why each student had inaccurate testimonies.

Research into eyewitness testimony became more popular nearly a century later in the 1980s and 1990s. As some research emerged about the potential unreliability of eyewitness memory concerns rose given the prevalent use of eyewitnesses for key evidence. Many details of crimes are obtained by interviewing witnesses, some of whom might testify in court, providing their account of the event into official evidence. Eyewitness testimony and identification of an accused is often a salient piece of evidence which unduly influences the opinions of the jury. As a result, incorrect or false eyewitness testimony has been found to be one of the most significant influences in the decision-making process among jurors. The combination of unreliable eyewitness recall and high regard of eyewitness testimony has led to the unjust convictions of many innocent people.

As a result of these findings, legal psychology researchers committed to creating and sharing evidence-based methods to promote best practices and lower the risk of a false eyewitness statement. In 1998, Wells et al., published an article of guidelines on the best methods collecting and using eyewitness testimony while protecting the integrity of the criminal justice system. In 2020, Wells et al., provided a much-needed update to these guidelines. This was done under the recommendation of the American Psychology-Law Society (Division 41). In the 20 years since its first publishing there has been significant research on this topic of eyewitness identification procedures.

The results yielded nine recommendations for planning, designing, and conducting eyewitness identification procedures. While four of the recommendations from the 1998 article were confirmed to be still be valid, there were an additional five recommendations added. Ultimately Wells et al., (2020), determined that “the reliability and integrity of eyewitness identification evidence is highly dependent on the procedures used by law enforcement for collecting and preserving the eyewitness evidence” (pg 1).

These findings reinforce the need for research to be ongoing, critical, and applied to all sectors of the criminal justice system. As more research in an area is published the strength and utility of procedures and outcomes is able to be re-evaluated to allow for continual improvements to the criminal justice system.

== See also ==
- Applied psychology
- Empirical legal studies
- Forensic psychology
- Investigative psychology
- Police psychology
- List of United States Supreme Court cases involving mental health
- Therapeutic jurisprudence
