= American Psychology–Law Society =

Professional association for psychologists and legal scholars

The American Psychology–Law Society (AP–LS) is an academic society for legal and forensic psychologists, as well as general psychologists who are interested in the application of psychology to the law. AP–LS serves as Division 41 of the American Psychological Association and publishes the academic journal Law and Human Behavior.

== Goals and publications ==
The American Psychology–Law Society pursues three primary goals: to advance the contributions of psychology to the understanding of law and legal institutions through basic and applied research; to promote the education of psychologists in legal matters and the education of legal professionals in psychological matters; and to inform both the psychological and legal communities, as well as the general public, about current research, educational initiatives, and service activities in the field of psychology and law. The AP-LS publishes the journal Law and Human Behavior and a monthly e-mailed newsletter entitled AP-LS News.

== History ==
The American Psychology–Law Society (AP-LS) was developed at a San Francisco meeting in September 1968, by founders Eric Dreikurs and Jay Ziskin. The society was first created for forensic and clinical psychologists. The first newsletter was published in October 1968. The original constitution was published later that year, and outlined the reasons for creating the society. These were to promote the study of law, influence legislation and policy, and to promote psychology in legal processes. A year after the San Francisco meeting, the AP-LS had 101 members. Most of the members were clinical psychologists, and nine of these original members were women.

This group had a stronger focus on psychology, as opposed to the Law and Society Association, which has similar goals, but a broader focus.

There was a controversy in 1971, when the founder, Jay Ziskin, wrote a book which stated that psychological evidence often did not meet reasonable criteria and should not be used in court of law. This statement sprouted debate in the society and caused the society's popularity to decline for a while. After this, June Louin Tapp became president of the society.

In 1976, Bruce Sales became the society's president, and helped refocus the society on the field of psychology and law. Sales had the goal to have the American Psychology–Law Society be the driving force behind the group. Sales, along with Ronald Roesch, helped the group publish many books, including Psychology in the Legal Process, Perspectives in Law and Psychology, and the journal Law and Human Behavior.

In the 1980s, Florence Kaslow asked the group to help develop a certification for forensic psychologists, but the group was not interested. This led Kaslow to create the American Board of Forensic Psychology, which helped keep the American Psychology–Law Society and forensic psychology separated. In the 1980s Division 41 of the APA began to discuss law and psychology, and began covering many similar policies of the AP-LS. Therefore, in 1983, Division 41 and AP-LS merged, under the agreement that Law and Human Behavior would be the journal for the group, and that the biennial meetings would continue to be held. The "new AP-LS" allowed for previous presidents to have a second term in the society, including Bruce Sales, who was the first president of the merged society.

== Specialty Guidelines ==
In 1991, the Committee on Ethical Guidelines for Forensic Psychologists began working to establish rules for forensic psychologists to follow in the court room. In 1992, the committee released "Specialty Guidelines" for forensic psychologists, on top of the Code of Conduct that they already were required to follow. Additionally in the 1990s, the society also established the Committee on Careers and Education, to help students find training programs to become psychologists in the legal system. In 1995, they held a conference to discuss education at undergraduate and post doctorate levels, how to offer legal psychology courses in the curriculum, and how to offer students experiences. The AP-LS also provides grants and funding for students who are interested in attending school for law-related psychology.

The Specialty Guidelines for Forensic Psychologists were first published in 1991. They are guidelines for forensic psychologists to encourage professional, quality, and systematic work in the law system and to those who the forensic psychologists serve. These are the only sets of APA-approved guidelines for a specific area of practice. The guidelines cover 11 points – responsibilities, competence, diligence, relationship, fees, informed consent notification and assent, conflicts in practice, privacy confidentiality and privilege, methods and procedures, assessment, and professional and other public communications.

After an extensive revision process, the Specialty Guidelines for Forensic Psychology were updated in October 2012.

== Membership ==
The AP-LS is composed of APA members, graduate and undergraduate students, and people in related fields to join the society. The members primarily have an interest in psychology and law issues. Many members are also members of the American Psychological Association, though it is not a requirement. Members gain access to the publications of Law and Human Behavior and the American Psychology-Law newsletter.

== Awards and honors ==
The AP-LS offers many grants and aid for undergraduates, graduates, early careers professionals, and research. In addition to grants, many awards are handed out yearly.

- The AP-LS Award for Best Undergraduate Paper: This award is given to an undergraduate student who has a paper focused on psychology and law.
- Dissertation Awards: These awards are distributed for scientific research relevant to the study of psychology and law. Winners may present their research at the AP-LS annual conference.
- The Saleem Shah Award: This award is also sponsored by the American Academy of Forensic Psychology. It is awarded for early career excellence and contributions to the field.
- Outstanding Teaching and Mentoring in the Field of Psychology and Law: This is an award to recognize excellence in teaching of subjects related to psychology and law.
- AP-LS Award for Distinguished Contribution to Psychology and Law: This is not awarded on a regular basis. It is an award reserved for unusual excellence and contributions in the field that are so important that it merits special commendations.
- The American Psychology-Law Society Book Award: This is awarded to a book each year to recognize outstanding scholarship in the field of psychology and law.
- AP-LS/AACP Award for Contributions to Correctional Psychology: This is also given by the American Association for Correctional Psychology. This award is given to professionals who have made an impact on the field of correctional psychology.

== Publications ==
- Law and Human Behavior: This journal is published six times a year. It discusses the issues that arise in law and psychology, including the legal process, the legal system, and the relationships between these and human behavior.
- AP-LS News: AP-LS publishes a monthly newsletter that is sent to its full e-mail list of members. These newsletters update on activities, volunteer and leadership opportunities, important legal cases that are occurring, new publications, and emerging topics in the field of psychology and the law. Past newsletters are available here: https://ap-ls.org/newsletter.

== Division 41 Presidents ==
Year	President
1969-70	Jay Ziskin
1970-71	Robert Kaplan
1971-72	Edward Shobin
1972-73	June Louin-Tapp
1973-74	Leonard Bellinson
1974-75	Alice Padawar-Singer
1975-76	Michael Nash
1976-77	Bruce Dennis Sales
1977-78	Paul Lipsitt
1978-79	John Monahan
1979-80	Leonard Bickman
1980-81	Donald Bersoff
1981-82	John Monahan
1982-83	David Rosenhan
1983-84	Patrick DeLeon
1984-85	Elizabeth Loftus
1985–86	Bruce Dennis Sales
1986–87	Stephen J. Morse
1987–88	Shari Seidman Diamond
1988–89	Michael Jay Saks
1989–90	Thomas Grisso
1990–91	Gary B. Melton
1991–92	Stephen L. Golding
1992–93	Norman G. Poythress Jr.
1993–94	Ronald Roesch
1994–95	Jane S. Goodman-Delahunty
1995–96	Kirk Stephen Heilbrun
1996–97	Gail S. Goodman
1997–98	John C. Brigham
1998–99	James R. P. Ogloff
1999–00	Murray Levine
2000–01	Steve Penrod
2001–02	Stephen D. Hart
2002–03	Randy K. Otto
2003–04	Solomon M. Fulero
2004–05	Edie Greene
2005–06	Gary L. Wells
2006–07	Joel A. Dvoskin
2007–08	Margaret Bull Kovera
2008–09	Saul Kassin
2009–10	Edward P. Mulvey
2010–11	Patricia A. Griffin
2011–12	Brian L. Cutler
2012–13	William E. Foote
2013–14	Jennifer Skeem
2014–15	Patricia Zapf
2015–16	Jennifer Woolard
2016–17	David DeMatteo
2017–18	Eve Brank
2018–19	Kevin S. Douglas
2019–20	Jennifer Groscup
2020–21	Allison D. Redlich
2021–22	Lora Levett
2022–23	Barry Rosenfeld
2023–24	Daniel Murrie
2024–25	Christian Meissner
2025-26	Randy Salekin
2026-27	Virginia Barber Rioja
