= Barbara Spellman =

Professor of law and psychology

Barbara Anne ("Bobbie") Spellman
- Born: September 30, 1956 (age 70); Queens, New York
- Citizenship: United States
- Spouse: Frederick Schauer (2010-2024)

Academic background
- Education: Roslyn High School (Long Island, NY), Wesleyan University (B.A.), New York University School of Law (J.D.), UCLA (Ph.D.)
- Website: https://www.law.virginia.edu/spellman

Barbara Anne ("Bobbie") Spellman is a professor of law and professor of psychology at the University of Virginia. Trained first as a lawyer, then as a cognitive psychologist, her work spans the two fields. As an academic psychologist, Spellman's research was in memory and higher order cognition (analogical, inductive, and causal reasoning). She also was involved early in the Open Science movement, mostly in her role as editor in chief of the journal Perspectives on Psychological Science from 2010 to 2015. As a legal academic, her work includes co-authoring "The Psychological Foundations of Evidence Law" with Michael J. Saks. She currently advocates for psychological science, and for science generally, as a fellow and member of the steering group of the Psychology Section of the American Association for the Advancement of Science. She has over 7,500 citations.

== Early life and education ==
Spellman was born on September 30, 1956, in New York City. Her family later moved to Roslyn, New York, where she graduated from Roslyn High School in 1974. In 1979, she received her B.A. degree from Wesleyan University (see List of Wesleyan University people). In 1982, she received her J.D. degree from New York University School of Law. In 1993 she received her Ph.D. from UCLA in cognitive psychology. While at UCLA she was a member of the Bjork Learning and Forgetting Lab and Cogfog. She is a member of the American Contract Bridge League and won several local and regional events during the 1980s.

== Legal career ==
After graduation from NYU School of Law, Spellman practiced tax law with the firm of Chadbourne & Parke (since merged with Norton Rose Fulbright). She then became a writer and editor in the tax area with Matthew Bender Company (now part of LexisNexis). As a law student, she worked summers at the United States Environmental Protection Agency and the United States Attorney for the Eastern District of New York.

== Academic career ==
=== Psychology ===
Spellman's work on analogy, mostly with her advisor Keith Holyoak, is best known for the article: “If Saddam IS Hitler then Who is George Bush?” (JPSP, 1991). It uses real life current events (the first Persian Gulf War) to examine the importance of knowledge and flexibility in analogical mapping. She is also known for an early paper that advanced the idea of “Analogical Priming” (M&C, 2001). Unlike most people who work on causal reasoning, Spellman wrote about both single-event causal reasoning and multiple-event contingency-causal reasoning (what she loosely refers to as: reasoning in law vs reasoning in science). “Crediting Causality” (1997, JEP:G), based on her dissertation, formed the groundwork for later papers with implications for views of legal causation. Her work on multi-event causation illustrated limitations on reasoning about the independent effects of two causes on one outcome (as might be seen in Simpson's paradox).

Spellman's work on memory includes a Psychological Review paper on the role of inhibition in human retrieval memory. She also worked on metamemory — specifically, the mechanisms behind the benefits of testing and judging one's own memory (with Robert A. Bjork). With Elizabeth R. Tenney (and others), she published several papers on evaluating people's credibility based on their previous memory performance.

She also contributed to a National Academies Report on lessons for intelligence analysis from the behavioral and social sciences (2011).

=== Open Science ===
Spellman was an early advocate for Open Science. During her tenure as editor of the journal Perspectives on Psychological Science (2010–15), the journal published over 100 articles related to the movement to reform science. Her final editorial, “A Short (Personal) Future History of Revolution 2.0” has been cited frequently as an introduction to the reform movement. She was involved in creating the TOP (Transparency and Openness Promotion) Guidelines, published in Science, which describes how journals can introduce practices to improve science, and she has often spoken publicly about those solutions.

=== Law ===
In the late 2000s, Spellman realized that law — both academic and as practiced — had become more sympathetic toward research from Psychological Science. She has described this appreciation as coming from two directions: (1) the mounting DNA exonerations showing that factors psychologists had worried about for years (e.g., bad eyewitness testimony; false confessions) had indeed contributed to wrongful convictions; and (2) the influence of economics on law, and the following influence of psychology on economics.

Spellman's law research includes applying psychology to legal issues — including questions about the reasoning of judges and juries, about the psychology embedded in the rules of evidence, and about how psychological is implicated in wrongful convictions. Currently, working with the Organization of Scientific Area Committees (OSAC) for Forensic Science, she is working on ways that psychology can help improve forensic science.
