= Law and Human Behavior =

- Discipline: Legal psychology, forensic psychology
- Language: English
- Edited by: David DeMatteo

Publication details
- History: 1977–present
- Publisher: American Psychological Association
- Frequency: Bimonthly
- Impact factor: 2.4 (2023)

Standard abbreviations
- Bluebook: Law & Hum. Behav.
- ISO 4: Law Hum. Behav.

Indexing
- CODEN: LHBEDM
- ISSN: 0147-7307 (print); 1573-661X (web)
- LCCN: 77641812
- OCLC no.: 03173559

Links
- Journal homepage; Online access

Law and Human Behavior is a bimonthly academic journal published by the American Psychology–Law Society. It publishes original empirical papers, reviews, and meta-analyses on how the law, legal system, and legal process relate to human behavior, particularly legal psychology and forensic psychology.

== Abstracting and indexing ==
The journal is abstracted and indexed by MEDLINE/PubMed and the Social Sciences Citation Index. According to the Journal Citation Reports, the journal has a 2023 impact factor of 2.4.

== Editors ==
- David DeMatteo, (2025-present) Drexel University
- Bradley D. McAuliff, (2019-2024) California State University, Northridge
- Margaret Bull Kovera, (2012-2018) John Jay College of Criminal Justice)
- Brian Cutler, (2007-2011) University of Ontario Institute of Technology
- Richard Wiener, (1997-2006) University of Nebraska–Lincoln
- Ronald Roesch, (1988-1996) Simon Fraser University
- Michael J. Saks, (1985-1988) Arizona State University
- Bruce Sales, (1977-1984) University of Arizona
