= Criminal Justice and Behavior =

Criminal Justice And Behavior
- Discipline: Criminology
- Language: English
- Edited by: Kristy Holtfreter

Publication details
- Former name: Correctional Psychologist
- History: 1965-present
- Publisher: SAGE Publications
- Frequency: Monthly
- Impact factor: 2.168 (2017)

Standard abbreviations
- ISO 4: Crim. Justice Behav.

Indexing
- CODEN: CJBHAB
- ISSN: 0093-8548 (print); 1552-3594 (web)
- LCCN: 74643412
- OCLC no.: 1793415

Links
- Journal homepage; Online access; Online archive

Criminal Justice and Behavior is a peer-reviewed academic journal that covers research in the fields of psychology and criminology. The editor-in-chief is Kristy Holtfreter (Arizona State University). It was established in 1974 and is currently published by SAGE Publications in association with the American Association for Correctional and Forensic Psychologists and the International Association for Correctional and Forensic Psychology.

== Abstracting and indexing ==
Criminal Justice and Behavior is abstracted and indexed in Scopus and the Social Sciences Citation Index. According to the Journal Citation Reports, its 2017 impact factor is 2.168, ranking it 15 out of 68 journals in the category "Criminology & Penology" and 55 out of 127 journals in the category "Psychology, Clinical".
