= Forensic psychology =

Connecting psychology and the justice system

Forensic psychology is the application of scientific knowledge and methods (in relation to psychology) to assist in answering legal questions that may arise in criminal, civil, contractual, personal injury, or other judicial proceedings. Practitioners, researchers, and academics are applied in the field to apply psychological principles in legal issues through forensic assessments, competency evaluations, expert testimony, correctional psychology, criminal investigations, and research in false confessions, interrogation practices, eyewitness testimony, and cognitive biases revolving forensic decision making. Forensic Psychologists also contribute to jury selection, reducing systemic racism in criminal law, identifying cognitive, behavioral, or organizational factors contributing to system failures, assessing military veterans for service connected disability compensation, and promoting culturally competent practices when psychologically evaluating diverse populations like racial and ethnic minorities, juveniles, and individuals with disabilities. The American Psychological Association's Specialty Guidelines for Forensic Psychologists reference several psychology sub-disciplines, such as: social, clinical, experimental, counseling, and neuropsychology,and emphasize the importance of ethical practices, objectivity, and evidence-based methods in legal settings.

== History ==
=== Early Foundations ===
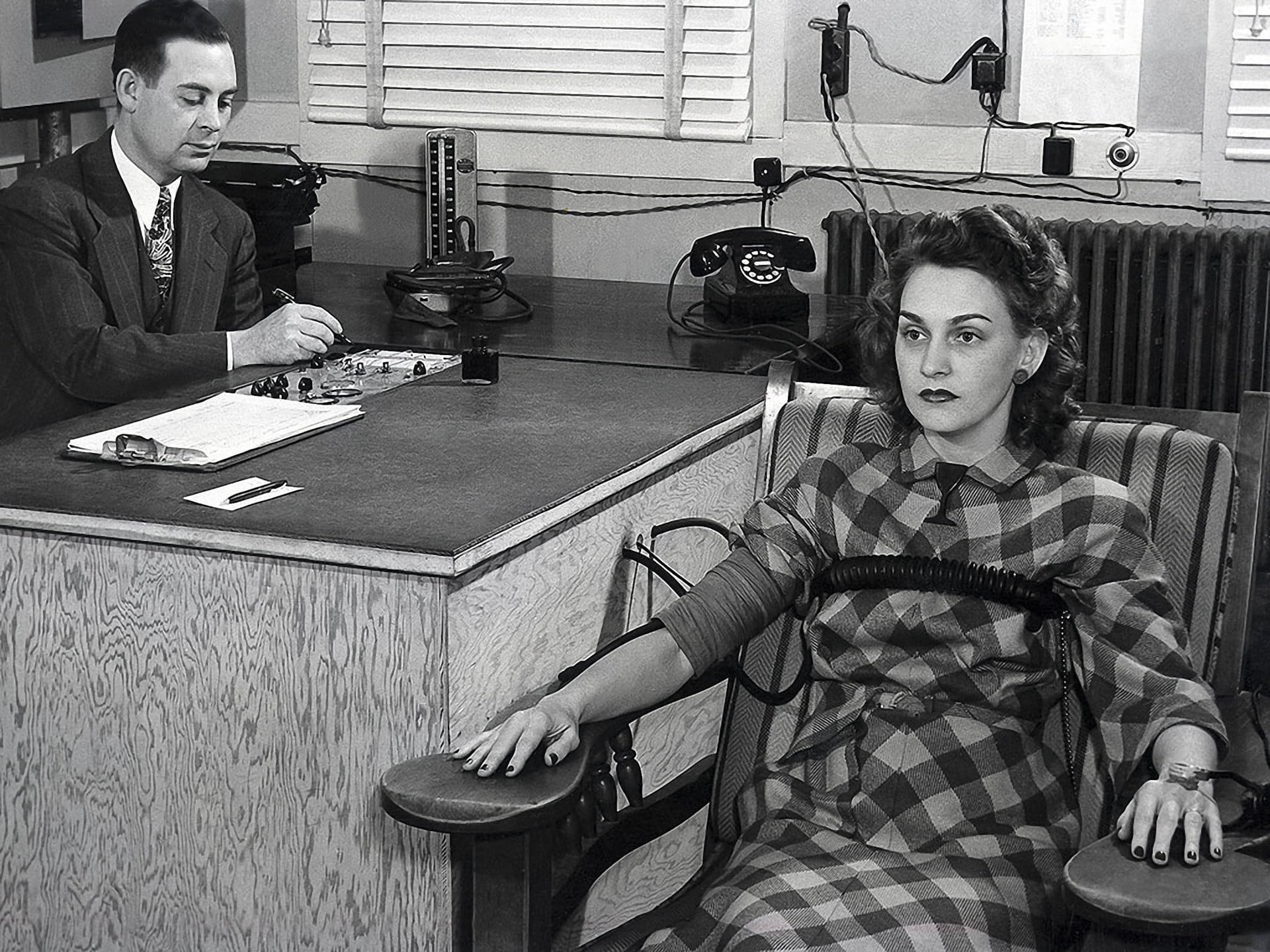
Lie detector security screening at the Clinton Engineer Works

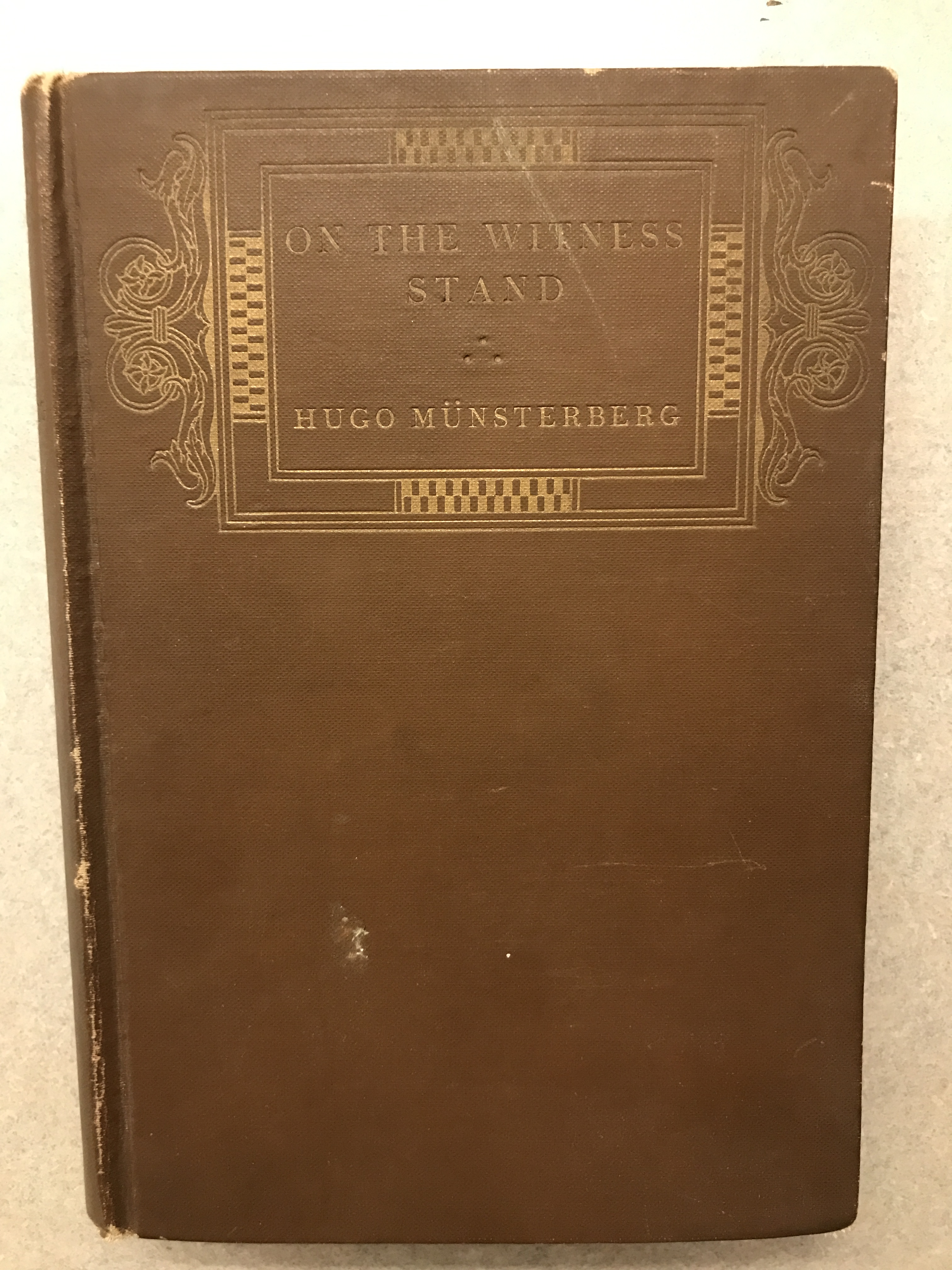
Front cover of an early edition of Hugo Muensterberg's "On the Witness Stand" book

As early as the 19th century, criminal profiling began to emerge, with the Jack the Ripper case being the first instance of criminal profiling, by forensic doctor and surgeon Thomas Bond. In the first decade of the 20th century, Hugo Münsterberg, the first director of Harvard's psychological laboratory and a student of Wilhelm Wundt, one of the first experimental psychologists, authored On the Witness Stand. In the publication, Münsterberg attempted to demonstrate how psychological research could be applied in legal proceedings. Sigmund Freud also discussed how psychopathological processes play a role in criminal behavior. Other significant early figures in forensic psychology include Lightner Witmer, and William Healy.

=== Adoption of Tools and Legal Practices ===
In 1917, the lie detector was invented by the psychologist William Marston. Six years after its invention, Marston brought his lie detector to court in the case of Frye v. United States at the request of James A. Frye's attorneys, who hoped Marston's device would prove their client's innocence. The results were not deemed admissible, due to lie detection not being widely accepted in the scientific community. This led to the creation of the Frye standard, which states scientific evidence is only admissible when it has prominent standing within the scientific community.

The 1954 case of Brown v. Board of Education of Topeka, was the first where the Supreme Court of the United States referenced expert opinions by psychologists. After this, the preponderance of psychological mechanisms within courtrooms began to be considered beneficial. Several years after the Brown ruling, Justice David Bazelon of the D.C. Circuit Court of Appeals ruled that psychologists had the legal authority to testify as medical experts about mental illness.

In 1993, the case of Daubert v. Merrell Dow Pharmaceutical introduced the standard of admissibility when an expert witness is on the stand. The case started after the parents of Jason Daubert and Eric Schuller, sued Merrell Dow Pharmaceuticals after their children were born with serious birth defects due to a drug called Bendectin. After moving the case to federal court, then Merrell Dow moved for summary judgement when they submitted documents show that there was no published scientific study demonstrating any links between the drug Bendectin and birth defects. Then Daubert and Schuller submitted expert evidence as well, showing that Bendectin did cause birth defects, based on in vitro and in vivo animal studies, pharmacological studies and reanalysis of other published studies. At the time of the case these methodologies of evidence were not considered to be acceptable. The summary judgement was granted to Merrell Dow, the parents appealed to the Ninth Circuit. The Ninth Circuit had only granted summary judgment because the plaintiffs' proffered evidence that were accepted as a reliable technique by scientist. The reason it was granted to Merrell Dow was because at the time of the case the Frye standard was considered the correct standard of evidence. This Daubert standard eventually became the standard used by the U.S. Supreme Court. The standard is considered to be a part of the Federal Rules of Evidence, this also includes the admissibility of evidence as well. The Supreme Court reversed, and remanded the case to the Ninth Circuit Court of Appeals. Through the remand, the court was able to analyze the evidence presented under the new standard and decided to uphold the district court's original grant of summary judgement for the defendant. Because of this case ruling the Daubert standard was considered by the U.S. Supreme Court, the old Frye standard while being used more by most states, has been slowly overturned and no longer referencing to it.

=== Field Recognition ===
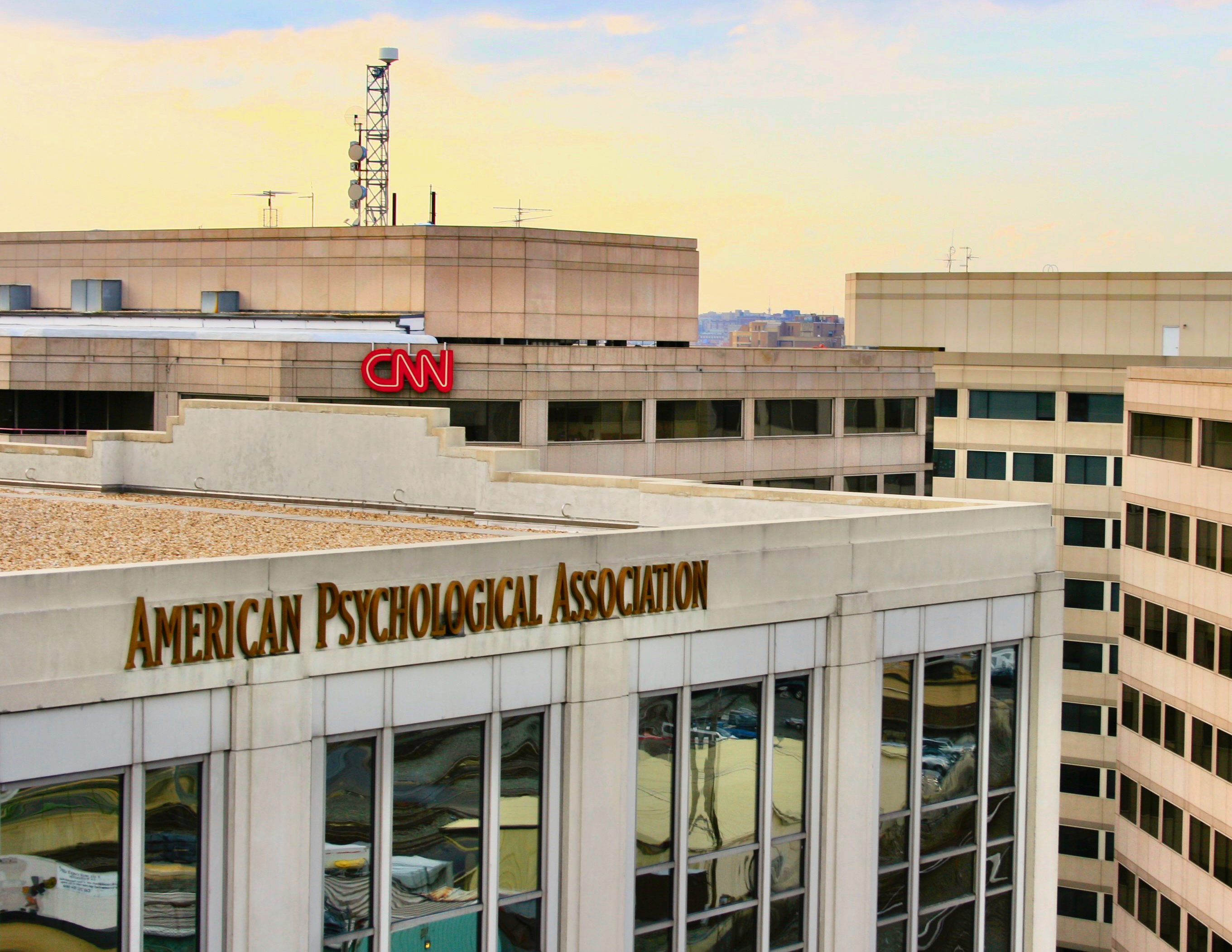
The American Psychological Association headquarters in Washington, D.C.

In 1969, the American Psychology–Law Society was founded, later being converted into Division 41 of the APA in 1980. As the field continued to grow, more organizations supported the application of psychology to the law. In 1976, the American Board of Forensic Psychology was chartered, eventually becoming part of the American Board of Professional Psychology in 1985. Organizations and conferences later aided in solidifying the development of forensic psychology, such as the American Academy of Forensic Psychology and the National Invitational Conference on Education and Training in Forensic Psychology. By 2001, forensic psychology was recognized as a professional specialty by the American Psychological Association.

=== Research Advancement ===
Modern forensic psychological research applies psychological methodology to legal contexts. In the 1980s, Saul Kassin, a psychology professor at the John Jay College of Criminal Justice in New York, published a series of papers on false confessions. One of Kassin's articles was instrumental in overturning the convictions of five boys who had been falsely convicted of the rape of a jogger. At the University of Liverpool, David V. Canter is credited with the creation of the term investigative psychology, a sub-specialization of forensic psychology that pertains to of criminal behavior and the investigative process. Through the psychological profiling of the Railway Rapists, Canter assisted in the capture of the killers. The 20th-century psychologist William Stern, conducted numerous experiments on eyewitness testimony, credibility, consistency, and the influence of leading questions in court.

=== Involvement in Pop Culture ===
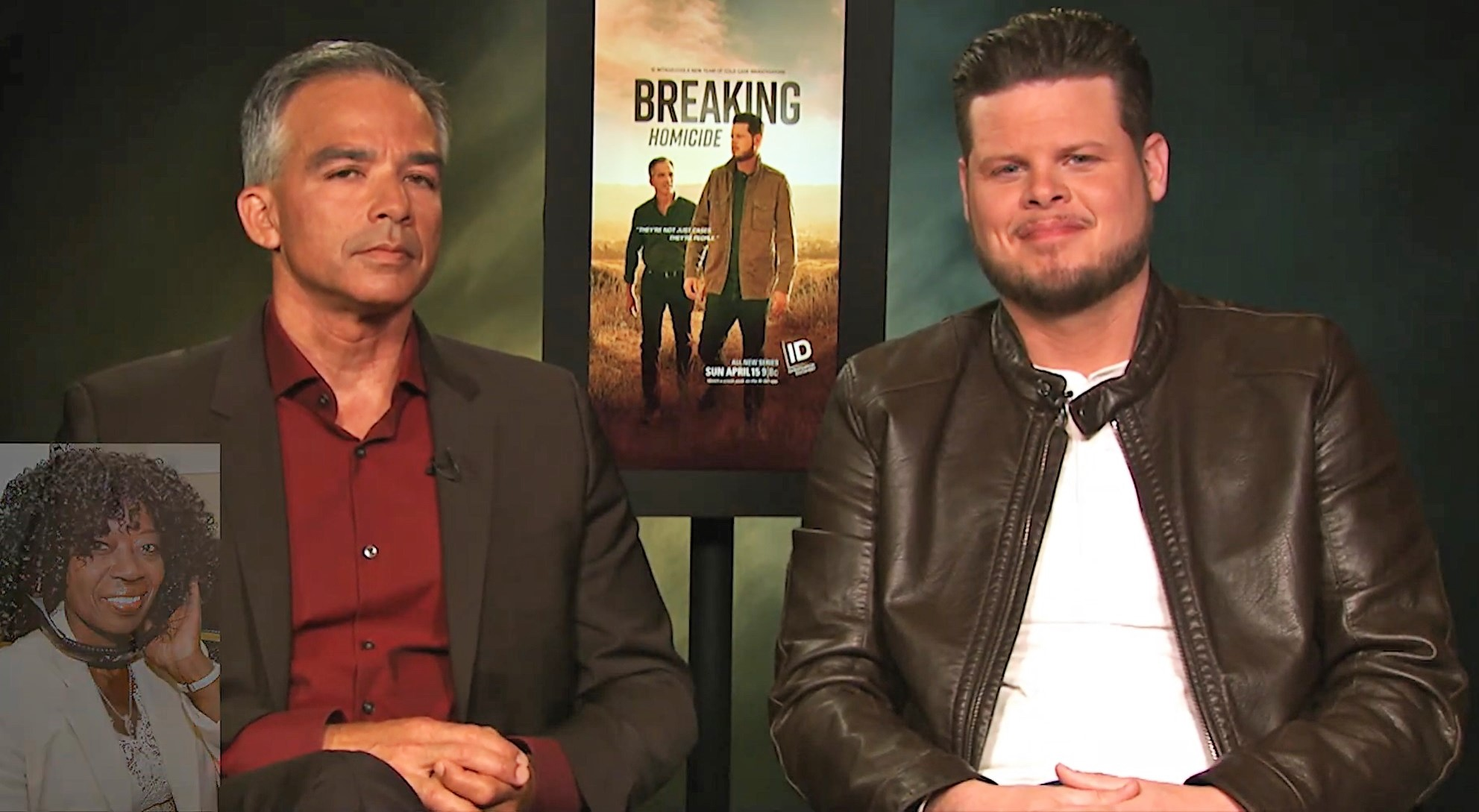
Kris Mohandie, Derrick Levasseur discussing "Breaking Homicide" on the Valder Beebee Show

Recently, forensic psychology has grown in popularity in the media. For example, many recent docuseries on Netflix feature forensic psychological content, including Making a Murderer and Sins of our Mother. Other TV shows and movies such as Criminal Minds, Manhunter, Mindhunter, and Silence of The Lambs have widely popularized the practice of criminal profiling, particularly within the Federal Bureau of Investigation's (FBI) Behavioral Analysis Unit (BAU). One example of a highly publicized case that used forensic psychology was Ted Bundy's sentencing. In 1980, he went to trial and was evaluated by multiple psychology professionals to determine his ability to stand before the court. The results from the multiple psychologist evaluations determined that Ted Bundy was fit to stand before the court.

== Training and education ==
Forensic psychology involves both elements of basic as well as applied work. Forensic psychologists may hold a PhD or Psy.D. in clinical psychology, counseling psychology, social psychology, organizational psychology, school psychology, or experimental psychology. There are no specific license requirements in the United States to be a forensic psychologist, although U.S. states, territories, and the District of Columbia require licensure for psychologists in the state they intend to practice. Certification specifically in forensic psychology is also available.

There are 67 forensic psychology degree programs offered in the US. Average tuition cost for an undergraduate is $7,687 in-state and $26,401 out-of-state. For a graduate, the average tuition cost is $11,167 in-state and $20,272 out-of-state.

A recent field survey of U.S. forensic psychologists found that most practitioners were mid-career, White, and female. Many respondents reported carrying student loan debt, and the study revealed gender-based and role-based pay disparities. There is a wide range of pay for individuals in the forensic psychology field. In the United States, the median annual income of clinical-forensic psychologists is $125,000 - $149,999, and the pay can range from $50,000 (entry-level) a year to more than $350,000 a year.

As of 2023, the U.S. Bureau of Labor Statistics, has seen a 7% rise in psychologist employment, which is faster than average, and there has been 207,500 new jobs for psychologists.

== Practice and research in forensic psychology ==
Forensic psychology may be utilized in five major areas (police and public safety, law, crime and delinquency, victimology and victim services, and corrections) and two sub-areas (family and schools). Closely allied to forensic psychology is the discipline of forensic human factors, which applies human factors theory, principles and data to analyze systems failures that involve interactions between users/operators with equipment, consumer products or processes. Forensic human factors professionals seek to understand and explain factors such as cognition, perception and human information processing, naturalistic decision making, situational awareness, and expectancy that may have contributed to specific human-system failures or injury events. Forensic human factors may be utilized to identify causal factors or establish liability in areas such as aviation accidents, automobile crashes, falls, occupational injuries, and sociotechnical system failure.

=== Practice/direct service ===
Forensic psychologists complete evaluations and assessments to assess a person's psychological state for legal purposes. Reasons for completing these evaluations can involve acquiring information for criminal court (such as insanity, incompetence), sentencing; family court (including child custody or parental termination cases), or civil court (involving, for example, personal injury, competence to manage one's financial affairs, and psychological autopsies especially as related to testamentary capacity). Additional assessments that these professionals can perform include school threats. Forensic psychologists also usually have to participate in court as a witness and assist judges, attorneys, or other court personnel in legal matters. This gives them the opportunity to help out as much as they can. Often times, their roles are evaluating the evidence, reviewing research, and advising on best practices. There is great debate about whether these Forensic Psychological evaluations constitute as health care treatment, with most arguments claiming they do not. A forensic psychologist is responsible for assessing and reporting results of an evaluation, but does not make decisions on "ultimate issues", such as competence to stand trial or service-connected disability for U.S. military veterans. Instead, the information provided by the expert evaluator is analyzed and is ruled on by the court which ordered the evaluation to take place. Recent research shows a trend toward using structured assessment tools in criminal responsibility evaluations. A study in Norway found that use of formal tools increased significantly over time, peaking at 58%, though it later declined slightly. These tools were closely linked to decisions regarding mental illness and legal responsibility.

==== Treatment ====
Forensic psychologists may be asked to administer psychological interventions to those requiring or requesting services in both criminal and civil cases. Regarding criminal cases, forensic psychologists can work with individuals who have already been sentenced to reduce the likelihood of repeating their offense. Other treatments are frequently put together in these case, especially for substance use disorder, sex offenders, mental illness, or anger management. As for civil proceedings, forensic psychology treats families going through divorce cases, custody cases, and psychological injuries due to trauma. Treatment often occurs in forensic and state psychiatric hospitals, mental health centers, and private practices.

==== Consultations ====
Providing consultations allows forensic psychologists to apply psychological expertise and research to help law enforcement, attorneys, and other legal professionals or proceedings better understand human behavior (e.g. criminal, witness, victim, jury), civil processes, effects of trauma or other life events, and so on. If working as a consultant, a forensic psychologist can be involved in legal proceedings through responsibilities such as reviewing court records (such as a defendant's psychosocial history or assessing mitigating or aggravating factors in a case), serving as a jury consultant (organizing focus groups, shadow juries, mock juries, or helping with the voir dire proceedings), and assessment without testimony (in which results of a defendant's evaluation are not disclosed to the prosecution team, allowing the defense team to develop a defense strategy), among others. Essentially, consultations can take many forms, including the common ones below:

1. Law enforcement consultations may take the form of assisting with criminal profiling, developing hiring procedures and methods, determining the psychological fitness of returning officers, or simply lending expertise on certain criminal behaviors. There are several methods and approaches related to criminal profiling, but there is a lot of skepticism and criticism about the efficiency and accuracy of criminal profiling in general. A couple common approaches are the scientific approach, which includes the FBI's Crime Scene Analysis and Canter's Investigative Psychology, and the intuitive approach, which includes Tukey's Behavioral Evidence Analysis.
2. Trial consultants are psychologists who work with legal professionals, such as attorneys, to aid in case preparation. This includes jury selection, development of case strategy, and witness preparation. Forensic psychologists working as trial consultants rely on research to best advise the individuals they are working with. Because trial consultants are often hired by one specific side in a trial, these psychologists face many ethical issues. It is the psychologist's responsibility to remain neutral when consulting. In other words, the consultant must not choose a side to support and consequentially omit or create information that would be beneficial to one side or another. In a study of forensic psychologists, many acknowledged that emotional reactions or subtle pressures from clients could introduce bias into their evaluations. Strategies like peer consultation and checklists were reported as ways to maintain objectivity in such high-stakes settings. Before accepting a case to work on, the forensic psychologist weighs the responsibilities of consulting on that case with the ethical guidelines put in place for the field of forensic psychology.

Expert testimony about matters relating to psychology is also an area in which forensic psychologists play an active role. Unlike fact witnesses, who are limited to testifying about what they know or have observed, expert witnesses can express further knowledge of a situation or topic because, as their name suggests, they are presumed to be "experts" in a certain topic and possess specialized knowledge about it. The requirements that must be met for forensic psychologists to be considered expert witnesses include clinical psychology expertise and knowledge of the laws that have jurisdiction over the court they are to testify. Procedural and legal rules guide expert testimony, including that the evidence must be relevant to the case, the method the expert used must be valid and reliable, and that the evidence will help the trier of fact. An expert can be deposed by opposing counsel to discover what they plan to say in court. Attorneys have the opportunity to raise a challenge to the admissibility of the expert's testimony if there are questions about its relevance, or its validity and reliability (in the United States - the rules vary by country and jurisdiction). Regardless of who calls in the expert, it is the judge who determines whether or not the expert witness will be accepted through a voir dire process of qualification.

=== Research ===
Forensic psychology researchers make scientific discoveries relevant to psychology and the law and sometimes provide expert witness testimony. These professionals usually have an advanced degree in psychology generally a PhD or similar. These professionals may be employed in various settings, such as: colleges and universities, research institutes, and government, private, or mental health agencies. Researchers test hypotheses empirically regarding issues related to psychology and the law, such as jury research and research on mental health law and policy evaluation. However, recent reviews of forensic psychiatric research raise concerns about transparency in sampling and participant recruitment. Many studies fail to report how subjects were selected or whether samples reflect the broader population. Their research may be published in forensic psychology journals such as Law and Human Behavior or Psychology, Public Policy, and Law, and more broadly, in basic psychology journals. Some famous psychologists in the field include Scott Lilienfeld, who was widely known for his scholarship on psychopathology and psychopathy; Saul Kassin, who is known for studying false confessions; Jennifer Skeem, who is known for studying justice-involved people with mental illness; Michael Saks, who is known for his contributions to jury research and improvements to forensic science; Barbara Spellman, who is known for her cognitive psychology-law work as well as for her open science leadership; and Elizabeth Loftus and Gary Wells, who are both known for their research on eyewitness memory.

=== Education ===
Academic forensic psychologists teach, research, train, and supervise students, among other education-related activities. These professionals also have an advanced degree in psychology (most likely a PhD) and are most often employed at colleges and universities. In addition to holding professorships, forensic psychologists may engage in education by presenting research, hosting talks about a particular subject, or engaging with and educating the community about a relevant forensic psychology topic.

=== Advocacy ===
Through advocacy, forensic psychologists can use psychological research to influence laws and policies. These may be related to certain movements, such as Black Lives Matter or the Me Too movement, or may even be related to certain civil rights that are being overlooked.

=== Risk Assessment and Sentencing ===
In recent decades, the use of risk assessment in criminal sentencing has grown. Forensic psychologists have been involved in assessing the probability that an individual will engage in future criminal or violent behavior. Risk assessment's goal in to reduce recidivism by incapacitating or treating high-risk offenders and to reduce prison populations by diverting low-risk offenders from prison. When risk assessments are incorporated directly into legal judgements about punishment, imprisonment, and release, forensic psychologists play three pivotal roles in shaping fair and evidence-based sentencing practices.

==== Roles in risk assessment sentencing ====
1. Inform decisions about imprisonment of higher-risk offenders - If an offender has the likelihood to commit crime again, the offender can be sentenced to a more severe sentencing.
2. Inform supervised release of lower-risk offenders - If an offender has a lower likelihood of committing another crime, a less severe sentencing can be determined.
3. Inform efforts to reduce offender risk status - Tools are used to monitor ebbs and flows in an offender's risk state which then determine the level of severity in sentencing.

When Forensic psychologists partake in risk assessment, risk factors are reviewed to determine the likelihood of criminal behavior. There are four types of risk factors for recidivism. A fixed marker is a risk factor that cannot be changed such as age. A variable marker cannot be changed through intervention like age. A variable risk factor can change through intervention such as employment status. A casual risk factor can change through intervention and can reduce recidivism such as substance abuse.

Risk assessment in criminal sentencing has been associated with four major concerns. Conflating risk with blame, generalizing individual data based on group data, measuring risk does not lead to risk reduction, and tools may produce bias and disparity. Additionally, risk-assessment instruments may inadvertently reinforce racial and socioeconomic disparities, as underlying data can reflect historical patterns of unequal treatment.

== Forensic psychological evaluations ==
=== Common types of evaluations ===
==== Forensic assessments of competencies ====
Competence, in a legal setting, refers to the defendant's ability to appreciate and understand the charges against them and what is happening in the legal proceedings, as well as their ability to help the lawyer understand and defend their case. Though it is the psychologist's responsibility to assess for competence, it is ultimately up to the judge to decide whether the defendant is competent or not. During competency evaluations, forensic psychologists assess an individual's cognitive understanding of legal proceedings, ability to communicate with legal counsel, and any psychological conditions that may impair their ability to understand or function. Evaluations typically consist of clinical interviews, review of legal and medical records, and psychological assessments (Zapf & Roesch, 2013).

If the defendant is found incompetent to stand trial, the psychologist must then give a recommendation on whether or not the defendant is unlikely to regain competency because of the severity of the underlying condition. Rehabilitation for these individuals include psychiatric treatment, interventions, psycho-education, or through competency restoration programs that focus on defendants' understandings of court proceedings and their defense. Potential causes of incompetence include brain damage, the occurrence of a psychotic episode, a mental disorder, or a developmental disability.

Multiple cases have helped define competence. In Dusky v. United States (1960), the case upheld the Youtsey v. United States ruling and established that the defendants must possess both factual and rational understanding of legal proceedings and able to consult with an attorney in a rational manner.

==== Forensic assessment of insanity ====
Insanity, as opposed to competence, refers to an individual's mental state at the time of the crime rather than at the time of the trial. According to legal principles of insanity, it is only acceptable to judge, find someone criminally responsible, and punish a defendant if that individual was sane at the time of the crime. In order to be considered sane, the defendant must have exhibited both mens rea and actus reus. Mens rea, translated to "guilty mind", indicates that the individual exhibited free will and some intent to do harm at the time of the crime. Actus reus refers to the voluntary committing of an unlawful act.

The insanity defense acknowledges that, while an unlawful act did occur, the individual displayed a lack of mens rea. The burden of proof in determining if a defendant is insane lies with the defense team. A notable case relating to this type of assessment is that of Ford v. Wainwright, in which it was decided that forensic psychologists must be appointed to assess the competency of an inmate to be executed in death penalty cases.

There are various definitions of insanity acknowledged within the legal system. The M'Naghten/McNaugton rule (1843) defines insanity as the individual not understanding the nature and quality of his or her acts or that these acts were wrong due to a mental disease or defect. This is also referred to as the cognitive capacity test. Meanwhile, the Durham Test (established in Durham v. United States, 1954) states that one can be declared insane if the actions were caused by a mental disorder. The vague nature of this description causes this definition to only be used in one state (New Hampshire). The final definition acknowledged within the courts is the Brawner Rule (U.S. v. Brawner, 1972), also referred to as the American Law Institute Standard. This definition posits that, due to a mental disease or defect, an individual is considered insane if unable to appreciate the wrongfulness of an act and are unable to conform their behavior to the dictates of the law.

Evaluating insanity involves using crime scene analysis to determine the mental state at the time of the crime, establishing a diagnosis, interviewing the defendant and any other relevant witnesses, and verifying impressions of the defendant.

Criteria for insanity can vary by state.

==== Violence risk assessment ====
Violence risk assessment evaluates how dangerous an individual is and the risk of them re-offending, also referred to as recidivism. Risk assessments are used in sentencing and affect the possibility of an inmate receiving parole or being released from prison. If someone poses a higher risk to others, that person would require intensive supervision and possible treatment. If someone poses a lower risk, it is likely they will avoid the intensive services. Imposition of the death penalty often requires a consideration of "future dangerousness," for which risk assessment can play a vital role.

Although there are many advocates for the use of risk assessment in sentencing, there are others who question whether risk assessments are accurate enough to be relied upon when making these consequential legal decisions. Understanding future behavior is a risk in its own because "risk" cannot be exact and is determined by the situation. There is a wide research literature on risk assessment, but the information is varied and sometimes contradictory, and bias can play a role in risk assessment.

- Types of violence risk assessments. There are several different methods of risk assessment, the main five of which are unstructured clinical assessment, anamnestic assessment, structured professional judgment, actuarial assessment, and adjusted actuarial assessment.
  - Unstructured clinical assessment is a form of risk assessment in which the forensic examiner or clinician decides both what information to use and how to use it to determine risk based on their clinical judgment. The information used in these types of assessments tends to come from in-depth interviews with the examinee, as well as collateral interviews with known personal contacts, the results of psychological testing, and historical records. Because these assessments rely heavily on the individual clinician's judgment, the interrater reliability for this method of assessing risk tends to be low. According to most research on predictive validity, unstructured clinical assessment is less accurate at predicting risk than other, more structured methods (though there have been some issues raised with the evidence supporting this claim).
  - Anamnestic assessment is another type, which is a form of clinical risk assessment that is focused on risk factors specific to the individual being examined. This type of risk assessment tends to be used for assessing violence risk, and relies heavily on an examinee's past history of violent behavior to identify risk factors for that individual behaving aggressively again, rather than risk factors for violence in general. Because these risk assessments are based on clinical interviews and tailored to the individual in question, they can be useful for determining ways to reduce an individual's violence risk, but they suffer from the same limitations as general unstructured clinical assessment in terms of interrater reliability.
  - Structured professional judgement (SPJ) is similar to unstructured clinical assessment in that the examiner still makes the final decision about risk, but it is more structured because these tools give the examiner specific, empirically based factors to focus on when assessing risk. Because of the more structured nature of these assessments, the interrater reliability of risk assessments done using these tools tends to be higher than that of those done using completely unstructured clinical assessment, and some argue the accuracy is higher than other types of assessment including actuarial methods, but there are questions about the legitimacy of these claims. Bias in forensic assessment may also arise from contextual influences found that even trained graduate students altered their interpretation of identical test data depending on case narratives, demonstrating that judgment can be unintentionally skewed by case details unrelated to the actual assessment results. Additionally, because most actuarial risk assessment tools are based on static (or unchanging) risk factors, SPJ tools tend to be better at identifying dynamic risk factors (which can be changed), and thus can be more useful in treatment settings than actuarial assessments.
  - Actuarial risk assessment is a more objective method of risk assessment that involves structured tools and algorithms that combine certain risk factors to produce a risk score or rating. The algorithm tells evaluators both which factors to pay attention to and how to weigh and combine them to produce the risk score. The risk factors included in actuarial tools are empirically linked to violence or recidivism risk and tend to be more static (permanent, unchanging) than dynamic (changeable). Because actuarial risk assessment tools provide the most guidance and involve the least amount of clinician judgment, they tend to have higher interrater reliability and to be more accurate than unstructured clinical assessment. Two example actuarial tools for assessing violence risk are the Violence Risk Appraisal Guide (VRAG) and the Classification of Violence Risk (COVR). An example actuarial tool for assessing sexual recidivism risk is the Static-99 Revised (Static-99R).
  - Adjusted actuarial risk assessment is a combination of unstructured clinical assessment and actuarial risk assessment. In adjusted actuarial assessment, evaluators use an actuarial method to determine risk, and then adjust the score produced by the algorithm based on their own clinical judgment. This type of risk assessment is meant to make actuarial instruments more flexible and adaptable to the facts of a specific case; however, supporters of the actuarial technique tend to criticize this method as forgoing the main benefit of actuarial risk assessment—the lack of subjectivity—by reintroducing clinician judgment after a risk assessment score has been calculated. A study of over 1,000 justice-involved youth found that those with high levels of mental health symptoms were also more likely to show multiple violence risk factors. The research identified distinct symptom profiles, suggesting a need for more tailored risk assessment and treatment in juvenile justice settings

Thirty-one meta-analysis studies have been performed to understand if one assessment tool is more accurate than the other. With over 45,673 risk assessments, findings showed structured tools significantly outperformed unstructured in determining violence risk. The most recent studies began in 2014 with those in the field calling it the "era" of risk assessment. As it's become more popular, the debate has grown increasingly. It's important for forensic psychologists to continue being aware of promoting consistency and fairness in legal decisions. The meta-analysis from Viljoen et al. (2025) reinforces the field's movement of evidence-based practice, quantifying the predictive validity of actuarial risk tools versus unstructured judgments allowing the field to continue aligning with ethical obligations and enhance accountability

==== Other types of evaluations ====
While insanity and competency assessments are among the most common criminal assessments administered within the legal system, there are several other types implemented. Some of these include death penalty case assessments, assessments of child sexual abuse, assessments for child custody or divorce cases, civil court assessments, and immigration/asylum cases.

- Immigration/asylum evaluations. In removal proceedings, the judge or parties may request the assistance of a forensic psychologist for those individuals eligible to apply for various forms of immigration benefits. There are eight grounds for an individual to apply for which are hardship, risk for torture, asylum, domestic violence, ANAC (abused, neglected, or abandoned children), discretionary determinations, risk assessment, and competence to proceed. Each removal proceeding is as unique as the individual on trial which is where mental health professionals play a crucial role in helping document their experiences as many individuals may or may not have proof to support their stories. In the case that an individual does apply for relief/protection from removal, a psychological evaluation is conducted by a forensic psychologist to help the court determine if the individual meets the requirements for the type of relief for which they are applying. Immigration evaluations are often done through a series of interviews with the individual and their family members that delve into their life of what led up to the migration, medical information such as history and physical examinations, social background information, and their current level of cognitive and psychological functioning.

=== Distinction between forensic and therapeutic evaluation ===
A forensic psychologist's interactions with and ethical responsibilities to the client differ widely from those of a psychologist dealing with a client in a clinical setting.

- Scope. Rather than the broad set of issues a psychologist addresses in a clinical setting, a forensic psychologist addresses a narrowly defined set of events or interactions of a nonclinical nature.
- Importance of client's perspective. A clinician places primary importance on understanding the client's unique point of view, while a forensic psychologist is interested in accuracy, and the client's viewpoint is secondary.
- Voluntariness. Usually, in a clinical setting, a psychologist is dealing with a voluntary client. A forensic psychologist evaluates clients by order of a judge or at the behest of an attorney.
- Autonomy. Voluntary clients have more latitude and autonomy regarding the assessment's objectives. Any assessment usually takes their concerns into account. The objectives of a forensic examination are confined by the applicable statutes or common law elements that pertain to the legal issue in question.
- Threats to validity. While the client and therapist are working toward a common goal, although unconscious distortion may occur, in the forensic context there is a substantially greater likelihood of intentional and conscious distortion.
- Relationship and dynamics. While therapeutic interactions work toward developing a trusting, empathic therapeutic alliance, a forensic psychologist may not ethically nurture the client or act in a "helping" role, as the forensic evaluator has divided loyalties and there are substantial limits on confidentiality they can guarantee the client. A forensic evaluator must always be aware of manipulation in the adversary context of a legal setting. These concerns mandate an emotional distance that is unlike a therapeutic interaction.
- Pace and setting. Unlike therapeutic interactions which may be guided by many factors, the forensic setting with its court schedules, limited resources, and other external factors places great time constraints on the evaluation without opportunities for revaluation. The forensic examiner focuses on the importance of accuracy and the finality of legal dispositions.

=== Eyewitness Identification ===
Category model of Wikipedia's list of 188 cognitive biases

In recent decades, cognitive and social biases have become an important evaluation tool for the justice system due to the raising concerns of possible unreliability when reviewing evidence. Researchers have examined how perception, memory, and judgement under bias (eyewitness identification) have affected outcomes. These are known as system variables. A system variable is any factor that is performed or controlled by the justice system that can inflate an outcome. This is only one cause that can often lead to misidentifications, equaling to wrongful convictions. A subcommittee was appointed by the American Psychology-Law Society in 2020 to provide updated guidelines in how identification evidence should be collected by the legal system to reduce misidentification risks. Results from the study presented five new recommendations, four prior recommendations carried over from a 1998 study, focused on improving legal procedures for collecting evidence, aiming to increase the reliability of the evidence and reduce bias, validation the importance of documenting how the identification process was conducted.

==== Nine Recommended Guidelines For Eyewitness Identification Procedures ====
- Prior Recommended Guidelines
  - Double-Blind Lineup - The individual administering the lineup and witness should not know who the suspect is.
  - Prelineup Instructions - Instructions should be provided to the eyewitness clearly stating the suspect may or may not be in the lineup, that the administrator does not know who the suspect is, and the eyewitness has the option to say "don't know" if a decision on the suspect cannot be made.
  - Lineup Fillers - The lineup should only include one suspect and the fillers should match the description of the suspect.
  - Immediate Confidence Statement - Once the eyewitness identifies a suspect from the lineup, a statement should immediately be taken backing up the confidence of the eyewitness.
- Recent Recommended Guidelines
  - Prelineup Interview - The witness(es) are to be interviewed immediately after the crime to document description, claims, prior familiarity, and validate the conditions of the witness.
  - Evidence-Based Suspicion - Clear evidence of the crime against the suspect should be clearly documented before bringing the individual in.
  - Video-Recording - The entire identification process should be recorded to allow for later review.
  - Avoid Repeated Identifications - Continuous identification procedures should not be conducted with the same eyewitness and suspected suspect.
  - Showups - A witness viewing a single suspect rather than a lineup can mislead the identification process.

==== Race and Bias ====
A growing area of research examines on how race influences the evaluation of juror sensitivity to eyewitness accuracy. This includes how psychological processes such as memory, bias, and perception can affect legal decision-making when identifying or misidentifying a suspect. Helm and Spearing (2016) identified through a mock crime study that lay assessors (potential jurors) interact in ways that affected systematic decision-making errors and showed limited ability to distinguish between accurate and inaccurate identifications. In particular, this study showed that racial bias influencers how jurors interpret identification evidence, jury education and diversity must be emphasized, and cross-race identification bis and memory reliability remains essential to avoid wrongful convictions.

== Ethics in forensic psychology ==
The ethical recommendations and expectations outlined for forensic psychology specifically are listed in the APA's Specialty Guidelines for Forensic Psychology. These guidelines involve reminders that forensic psychologists should value integrity, impartiality, and fairness, as well as avoid conflicts of interest when possible. These conflicts of interest may arise in situations in which the psychologist is working as a consultant to one side or another in a court case, when the psychologist is required to testify or evaluate something that collides with their own beliefs or values, or when a psychologist is faced with the decision of choosing between playing the role of an individual's evaluator or treatment provider in a case. This final conflict of interest also relates to the ethical guidelines relating to having multiple relationships with clients. As a standard of ethics, forensic psychologists are expected to offer a certain amount of reduced fee or pro bono services for individuals who may not be able to afford hiring a psychologist for a court case otherwise. Other ethical guidelines involve receiving informed consent from clients before communicating information regarding their treatment or evaluations, respecting and acknowledging privacy, confidentiality, and privilege among clients, remaining impartial and objective when involved in a trial, and weighing the moral and ethical costs of complying with any court orders that may conflict with professional standards. Forensic Psychologists are required to work within the limitations of their competence, as determined by their education, training, supervised experiences, consultation, research, or professional experience.

=== Examples of skewed ethics ===
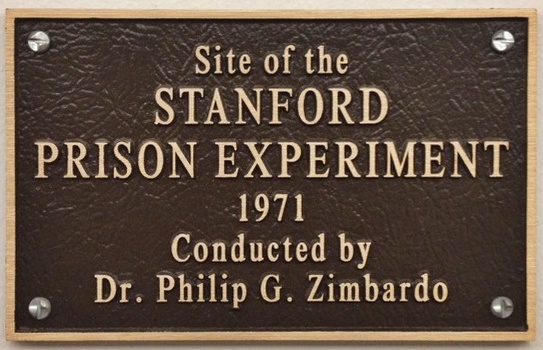
This image shows a plaque marking the site where the famous Stanford Prison Experiment was conducted.

An example of skewed ethics in forensic psychology would be the different tests used to measukuire the command of authority. Two very infamous cases of this would be the Stanford Prison Experiments and the Milgram experiment. The Stanford Prison Experiment put college aged students into a prison simulation where they were randomly assigned to fulfill the role of either "guards" or "prisoners" This case was found to be unethical because it was found to be harmful to the participant past what should have been allowed. Stanley Milgram conducted research on how far people would go to obey authority figure if another person was harmed in the process. How the situation influenced the individual proves as a way to draw conclusions about the individual and their upbringing. Forensic psychology finds this information useful to know when and how authority can affect a situation, but mostly to know the boundaries that research can be pushed and when something is deemed unethical. [Author: Gerald Arandia Pasno ]

== Police interrogations and false confessions ==
Forensic psychologists study how certain police interrogation methods can contribute to false confessions, particularly among vulnerable populations. Research shows that lengthy interrogations, coercive interrogation techniques, sleep deprivation, and false evidence being presented can increase the likelihood of an innocent individual confessing to a crime they did not commit. Individuals who are juveniles, have intellectual or developmental disabilities, suffer from mental illness, or contain higher suggestibility and compliance are at a higher risk for providing false confessions, typically to escape intense investigations (Kassin et al., 2010). False confessions can be divided into three categories: voluntary, compliant, and internalized (persuaded) confessions; which vary depending on the psychological state of the individual, level of internal belief regarding the confession, and degree of pressure experienced (Gudjonsson, 2003). Research also demonstrates that false confessions can also contribute to psychological distress and can influence legal decision making from investigators, prosecutors, judges, and juries (Kassin et al., 2010).

Another important focus of forensic psychology is assessing the risk of violence in stalking and obsessional harassment cases. Studies have found that prior relationships, threats, and certain behavioral patterns can significantly increase the chance of violence. Forensic psychologists also examine eyewitness memory and identification. Research has shown that confirming feedback after a mistaken identification can cause a witness to become more confident while decreasing the accuracy of their memory. New technology like eye-tracking add new methods for understanding cognitive and behavioral responses associated with criminal behavior and forensic risk assessments.

Psychological research has identified multiple types of interrogation tactics, such as deception of evidence, promises of leniency, downplaying the severity of the situation, or threatening consequences to denial, that increase the risk of false confessions (Kassin et al., 2010) This can confuse suspects or make them feel like confessing is the best or only option, even if they are innocent. Most police interrogation techniques come from interrogation manuals, which often fail to acknowledge the possibility that the techniques they teach could lead to a false confession. These manuals do not disclose this information since the techniques revolve around deception in order to get a suspect to confess as a confession is the goal in these interrogations. Forensic psychologists try to understand why this happens and how to prevent it.

To reduce the likelihood of false confessions, researchers have recommended recording investigations, limiting psychological coercive tactics, identifying vulnerabilities in suspects before questioning, and creating an evidence-based investigation focusing on accurate information and not obtaining a confession. Forensic psychologists also explain their findings in court and help educate others about the risks of false confessions. Officers are now encouraged to look out for signs that a suspect might be vulnerable such as being very young, having a disability, or not fully understanding what's going on. Another method of reform is the switch from a criminal interrogation style to an intelligence interrogation style. Criminal interrogations aim at getting a confession out of a suspect whereas, intelligence interrogations focus on acquiring accurate information on which legal action can be taken. Studies have shown that intelligence interrogations are more successful in producing reliable information since they rely on non-confrontational methods and communication based on respect, dignity and integrity. This cooperative environment reduces the chances of coercion and false confessions improving the accuracy of the acquired information. By improving how interrogations are done it can help make the legal system more fair and accurate.

== Consent ==
Consent plays a large role in Forensic Psychology. Informed consent is required for psychologists, and when services are required by law or another authority, psychologists must inform the individual of the nature of the anticipated services, including whether the services are court ordered or mandated and any limits of confidentiality, before proceeding, according to the APA ethics code 3.10(c). Additionally, standard 3.10(d) stipulates that consent needs to be well documented. Both the individual in question and the council that is representing them must provide their approval. If the person is legally unable to give their own consent then legal counsel for that individual must be sought. The person must be informed by the Forensic Psychologist of all the various guidelines pertaining to the expected services, including the extent of confidentiality.

== Confidentiality in Forensic psychology ==
A forensic psychologist's primary responsibility is to safeguard their clients anonymity by taking appropriate measures and communicating any limitations, the client is trusting them to keep all topics discussed with them confidential. Only the clients or legally authorized person's consent may be disclosed; without the clients consent, disclosure may only occur when required by law, when the psychologist utilizes the information for the clients protection or consultation, or both.

== Diversity and Equity ==
Cultural, racial, and socioeconomic factors influence forensic evaluations and interactions with the legal system. Forensic psychologists consider an individual's cultural background, identity, language, and life experiences when performing psychiatric evaluations while maintaining objectivity (APA, 2013). Research shows that different cultures and populations experience disparities regarding mental illness, disabilities, and juvenile behavior in the legal system. These disparities can influence the original forensic assessment resulting in the influence of sentencing and provided help. Therefore, forensic psychologist have emphasized the importance of culture based forensic assessments and evaluations to improve fairness and accuracy when making legal decisions (Neal & Brodsky, 2016).

== Cognitive Bias ==
Cognitive bias in forensic evaluations occur when systematic patterns of judgement influence a forensic psychologists' observations, interpretations, or conclusions during the assessment. Because forensic evaluations have heavy association with competency to stand trial, criminal responsibility, risk statistics, sentencing, and other important aspects of the legal process, forensic psychologist must remain objective and minimize bias (APA, 2013). Research shows that forensic evaluators are susceptible to cognitive biases that can effect decision-making. Forensic psychologists recognized several situations that could increase the likelihood of bias: pre-existing personal values, limited cultural competence, emotional reactions, exposure to irrelevant or influencing information, colleagues, etc (Neal & Brodsky, 2016).This concept is known as the "bias blind spot," where evaluators tend to see themselves as less susceptible to bias than their surrounding peers (Neal & Brodsky, 2016).

To reduce the effects of cognitive bias, forensic psychologists follow an evidence-based assessment procedure and limit bias language. Research has suggested that structured de-biasing strategies are effective in collecting objective and scientifically supported forensic evidence and assessment findings (Neal & Brodsky, 2016). Reducing cognitive bias is important so that legal standings are as accurate and fair as possible. Ongoing research has showed that standardized evaluation procedures improve the reliability, transparency, and fairness of forensic psychological assessments, which is why they are becoming increasingly popular (Neal et al., 2022).

== Notable research in forensic psychology ==
- Maryanne Garry conducted research on imagination inflation, and whether imagining a childhood event inflates confidence that it occurred. The study investigated whether imagining a childhood event that did not happen increased individuals confidence that it did. The results suggested that participants who originally reported an event did not happen changed their mind after imagining the scenario. Moreover, Garry also conducted research that used the premise of misremembered events in relation to eye witnesses and their chance of accepting (and confirming) a suggested occurrence, even if it was not accurate to what they saw. The study found that 30% of participants met criteria for false memory and 43% met criteria for false memories.
- Research by Tess Neal found that while there are a number of psychometric measuring tools that are used by psychologists in legal cases, there are few challenges to the result they present. Neal's publications also assist lawmakers' understanding as to when psychological assessments can be challenged; similarly, they help psychologists to see when their assessments can be strengthened.

== See also ==
- Applied psychology
- Criminal psychology
- Forensic psychiatry
- Settled insanity
- Competency evaluation (law)
- List of United States Supreme Court cases involving mental health
- Media psychology
- Medical jurisprudence
