= Pluralistic ignorance =

Incorrect perception of others' beliefs

In social psychology, pluralistic ignorance (also known as a collective illusion or collective delusion) is a phenomenon in which people mistakenly believe that others predominantly hold an opinion different from their own. In such cases, many people in a group may go along with a view they do not hold because they think, incorrectly, that most other people in the group hold it. Pluralistic ignorance encompasses situations in which a minority position on a given topic is wrongly perceived to be the majority position, or the majority position is wrongly perceived to be a minority position.

Pluralistic ignorance can arise in different ways. An individual may misjudge overall perceptions of a topic due to fear, embarrassment, social desirability, or social inhibition. Individuals may develop collective illusions when they fear backlash for holding beliefs they think differ from society's beliefs. From a group-level perspective, divergence between public behavior and private opinion can result from conservative lags (change in attitude without a change in behavior), liberal leaps (change in behavior without a change in attitude), and social identities (conforming to societal expectations of how one should behave based on the traditional ideals of the group).

However, pluralistic ignorance describes the coincidence of a belief with inaccurate perceptions, not the process by which those inaccurate perceptions are formed. Related phenomena, such as the spiral of silence and false consensus effect, demonstrate that pluralistic ignorance is not unique in its inaccurate assumption of others' opinions, and these misconceptions can lead to negative consequences, such as groupthink and the bystander effect.

== History ==
Floyd Allport first discussed the phenomenon of "literal attitude behavior inconsistency" in 1924, observing society's tendency to conform to social norms at a large scale even in the absence of personal agreement with those norms. In an effort to explain this inconsistency, Allport proposed that individuals often do not act on personal convictions unless they believe those convictions are shared by the people around them. In Allport's 1931 book, Students Attitudes: A Report of the Syracuse University Research Study, co-written with his student Daniel Katz, the term "pluralistic ignorance" was used for the first time.

Allport and his students Daniel Katz and Richard Schanck produced studies of attitude change, racial stereotyping, and prejudice, and their pursuit of connections between individual psychology and social systems helped to found the field of organizational psychology.

Further behavioral, economic, and social-psychology research was conducted by Todd Rose, who argued for the interchangeability of the terms "pluralistic ignorance" and "collective illusions". Citing historical events, scientific studies, and social media patterns, he contends that using either term refers to the same phenomenon, and that social systems can perpetuate misperceptions and individuals seek to fit in.

Although social psychologists such as Allport and Katz initiated the development of the concept, work on pluralistic ignorance has been heavily conducted by sociologists and public-opinion researchers. This shift, in part, has been attributed to laboratory experiments—the primary research method of social psychology—being considered insufficient for studying inconsistencies between attitudes and norms.

Though Allport was the first person to bring wider attention to pluralistic ignorance, his analysis of this phenomenon was strictly at the individual level. He strongly disagreed with expanding the discussion to the larger group and involving the concept of shared cognition, "the collective cognitive activity from individual group members where the collective activity has an impact on the overall group goals and activities."

This is not a unanimous stance among those who have studied pluralistic ignorance. Sargent and Newman acknowledge that the individual aspects are important to discuss but argue that they are insufficient to provide a full picture of the phenomenon. In their view, pluralistic ignorance is "a group-level phenomenon, wherein individuals belonging to a group mistakenly believe that others' cognitions (attitudes, beliefs, feelings) and/or behaviors differ systematically from their own, regardless of how the misperception arises".

== Research ==
Prentice and Miller conducted a study on pluralistic ignorance, examining individuals' beliefs on alcohol use and their estimates of peers' attitudes. They found that, on average, individuals' comfort with campus drinking practices was lower than what they believed to be the average. In one subset of experiments, they tracked changes in attitudes toward alcohol consumption among men and women over the semester. Among men, private attitudes shifted toward the perceived norm, consistent with cognitive dissonance; women showed no comparable shift. Additionally, students' perceived deviance from the alcohol-use norm correlated with several measures of campus alienation. Although the deviance was perceived rather than actual, it was associated with feelings of isolation and with greater discrepancies between individual beliefs and perceived group beliefs, a pattern characteristic of pluralistic ignorance. Overall, the study indicated pluralistic ignorance: students believed others’ comfort with drinking was significantly higher than their own, even though actual comfort levels were similar.

Additional research has found pluralistic ignorance among both those who indulge and those who abstain. Examples include beliefs about traditional vices such as gambling, smoking and drinking, as well as lifestyles such as vegetarianism. The latter illustrates that pluralistic ignorance can result from the structure of underlying social networks, not exclusively from cognitive dissonance, indicating multiple pathways for its emergence.

== Applications ==
=== Racial segregation in the United States ===
Pluralistic ignorance has been cited as exacerbating support for racial segregation in the United States. It has also been proposed as a reason for the illusory popular support that kept the Communist Party of the Soviet Union in power, as many opposed the regime but assumed that others supported it; consequently, most people were afraid to voice their opposition.

=== Alcohol consumption on college campuses ===
Another case concerns campus drinking in countries where alcohol use is prevalent at colleges and universities. Students drink at weekend parties and sometimes at evening study breaks. Many drink to excess, some on a routine basis. The high visibility of heavy drinking, combined with reluctance to show any public concern or disapproval, gives rise to pluralistic ignorance: Students believe that their peers are much more comfortable with this behavior than they themselves feel.A 2018 review examined methods used to address students' inaccurate perceptions of their peers' drinking habits and attitudes. Such interventions can provide students with information about their peers' actual drinking behaviors and attitudes to correct inaccurate beliefs about what is considered normal. However, the review identified limitations in the existing research, as some studies did not assess whether these interventions corrected participants' misperceptions of social norms.

=== "The Emperor's New Clothes" fairy tale ===
Hans Christian Andersen's fairy tale "The Emperor's New Clothes" is a fictional case of pluralistic ignorance. In the story, two con artists claim to make the finest clothes, said to be invisible to those unworthy or foolish. Out of fear of being judged, the emperor's court and townspeople remain silent about seeing nothing until a child says that the emperor is not wearing any clothes, prompting others to acknowledge the truth.

=== Public concern for climate change ===
Research found that 80–90% of Americans underestimate the prevalence of support for major climate change mitigation policies and climate concern among fellow Americans. While 66–80% Americans support these policies, Americans estimate the prevalence to be 37–43%—barely half as much. Researchers have called this misperception a false social reality, a form of pluralistic ignorance.

Pluralistic ignorance has been cited to explain why large majorities of the public remain comparatively quiet about climate change—while solid majorities in the United States and the United Kingdom report concern, many people mistakenly believe they are in the minority. Over multiple studies, about 80–89 percent of the world's people want governments to do more to address climate change and nearly two-thirds support action that would cost them personally, but most think they are the minority—believing that only ~30% support stronger climate action. It has been suggested that pollution-intensive industries contribute to this underestimation of public support for climate solutions. For example, in the U.S., support for pollution pricing is high, yet public perception of public support is much lower.

In August 2022, Nature Communications published a survey of 6,119 representatively sampled Americans finding that 66-80% supported major climate-mitigation policies (i.e. 100% renewable energy by 2035, the Green New Deal, a carbon tax and dividend, renewable energy production siting on public land) and expressed climate concern, but 80-90% how common such support and concern were—estimating only 37-43% support on average. Respondents in every state and assessed demographic group underestimated support by at least 20 percentage points. The researchers attributed the misperception to pluralistic ignorance; they suggested that conservatives underestimated support due to a false-consensus effect, exposure to more conservative local norms, and consumption of conservative news, while liberals did so due to a false-uniqueness effect.

=== Tulip mania of 1634 ===
Tulip mania has been cited as an example of how investors can be swept up in financial frenzy due to collective illusion. Members of the Dutch elite pursued unique collections of spring-flowering bulbs, and prices rose rapidly.

=== Women working outside the home in Saudi Arabia ===
A 2020 study found that the vast majority of young married men in Saudi Arabia privately support women working outside the home but substantially underestimate how widely other similar men share that view. When informed of the high level of support, men were more likely to help their wives obtain jobs.

== Causes of divergence in public vs. private opinion ==
Pluralistic ignorance can arise from several aspects of human interaction. At the group level, three key causes are commonly discussed.

=== Conservative lag ===
The conservative lag is the most common cause of pluralistic ignorance and has also been labeled "conservative bias". It refers to a change in attitude that is not followed by a change in behavior. A frequently cited example is the civil rights movement. Although there was a shift in the private opinions of White Americans toward African Americans and the practice of segregation, a shift in social norms and public behavior did not occur until long after. This illustrates an aspect of social change: "a society's perception of itself tends to lag behind actual changes in people's private beliefs and values".

=== Liberal leap ===
A liberal leap is a change in behavior that is not followed by a change in attitude. This cause is often associated with revolutions or polarizing events that alter social practices. Examples include the shift in French public support for the Church in the 18th century while private attitudes remained the same, and the sexual revolution in United States during the 1960s and 1970s, which brought changes in public behavior and sexual expression while personal attitudes remained consistent.

=== Social identities ===
This cause focuses on the relationship between a person's social identity and their behavior in social settings. In an effort to conform to particular values, ideals, and norms, an individual's behavior may not align with their attitude or beliefs. This is commonly associated with studies of gender norms, such as children choosing toys and activities that are associated with their biological gender even when they are interested in alternatives that do not fit traditional expectations.

== Consequences ==
In recent years, pluralistic ignorance has been described as a roadblock to collective action on public issues such as climate change and the COVID-19 pandemic.

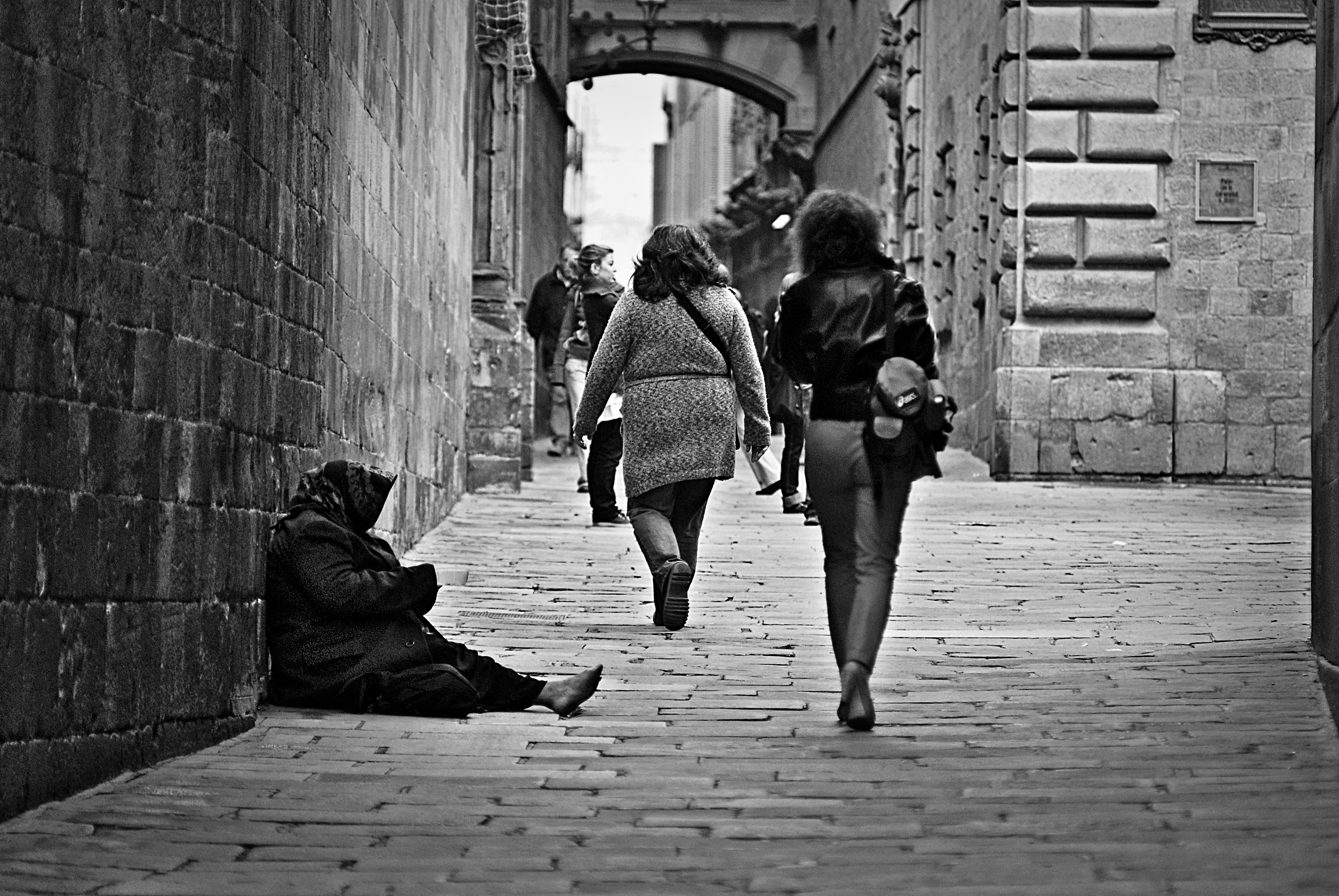
A common illustration of pluralistic ignorance is the bystander effect: a person in apparent need receives no assistance because passersby infer from others’ inaction that help is unnecessary or unwelcome, which in turn discourages action by additional bystanders.

Pluralistic ignorance has also been proposed as a reason for the rapid growth of far-right parties in recent years.

Another consequence is groupthink, in which small, cohesive groups make poor decisions. A related notion is the "illusion of unanimity", where an individual believes they are the only dissenter in a group. This perception can lead people to accept a decision they privately doubt if they think their disagreement is not shared.

Perhaps the most researched consequence from an individual perspective is the bystander effect. In its simplest form, an individual witnesses an event that prompts strong emotions but does not act because surrounding bystanders make no visible effort to intervene, giving the impression that the individual's reaction is not shared. This can result in inaction by all observers even when intervention might be appropriate.

Pluralistic ignorance can also cause people to feel alienated from a group. When a person's attitude appears to conflict with the perceived majority, it can leave the individual "embittered" and "suspicious of those around them". It may motivate speaking out against the perceived majority view or withdrawing entirely. More commonly, individuals conform in speech and behavior, potentially even changing personal convictions to align with what they inaccurately perceive as the majority opinion.

== Related phenomena ==
=== False consensus effect ===
Pluralistic ignorance can be compared with the false consensus effect. In pluralistic ignorance, people privately reject but publicly support a norm or belief. In the false consensus effect, people wrongly assume that most others think as they do and openly share that view. For example, pluralistic ignorance may lead students to drink excessively because they believe everyone else approves, even if others also wish to avoid binge drinking but do not express this out of fear of ostracism. By contrast, a false consensus in the same setting would involve a student believing that most others dislike heavy drinking when, in fact, most enjoy it and say so.

A study by Ross, Greene, and House used brief questionnaires with Stanford undergraduates to examine the false consensus effect. Participants reported the choice they would make in various scenarios and estimated what "people in general" would do, considering traits such as shyness, cooperativeness, trust, and adventurousness. Those who chose a given option tended to rate that option as relatively probable for "people in general," while those who rejected it rated it as relatively improbable. The subjects' own choices influenced their estimates of commonness. Although both phenomena involve social norms, they take opposing stances: false consensus assumes broad agreement with one's own view, whereas pluralistic ignorance involves publicly going along with a view one privately does not share.

=== False uniqueness effect ===
This phenomenon resembles pluralistic ignorance in that it centers on perceived differences between oneself and others, often in a self-enhancing direction. People tend to view themselves as better at possessing positive traits than those around them. Unlike pluralistic ignorance, the false uniqueness effect is primarily an individual-level phenomenon without group-dynamic preconditions or outcomes.

=== Spiral of silence ===
The parallel between pluralistic ignorance and the spiral of silence lies in how perceived public opinion diverges from genuine attitudes. From a social perspective, pluralistic ignorance can be fueled by widely shared misinformation from highly visible sources. Visibility matters: when a loud or disruptive group dominates attention, it can appear more influential than it is. As the most visible opinions are expressed publicly and repeatedly, differing views and voiced less or at a smaller scale, producing a misleading picture of group attitudes. Pluralistic ignorance can thus contribute to a shift in the climate of opinion, and the spiral of silence persists and people who see their views as a minority (even if they are not) choose to remain silent.

== See also ==
- Abilene paradox
- Asch conformity experiments
- Common knowledge
- Conformity
- Die Wende
- False consensus effect
- Glasnost
- Groupthink
- Mutual knowledge
- Peer pressure
- Political correctness
- Prisoner's dilemma
- Preference falsification
- Silent majority
- Spiral of silence
- Social norms approach
- Stag hunt
- Thomas theorem
