= Society for the Psychological Study of Social Issues =

Founded in 1936, the Society for the Psychological Study of Social Issues (SPSSI) is a group of 3,000 scientists from psychology and related fields who share a common interest in research on the psychological aspects of important social and policy issues. In various ways, SPSSI seeks to bring theory and practice into focus on human problems of the group, the community, and nations, as well as on the increasingly important problems that have no national boundaries. SPSSI affords social and behavioral scientists opportunities to apply their knowledge and insights to the critical problems of today's world. SPSSI fosters and funds research on social issues through annual awards and programs of small research grants and disseminates research findings through its scholarly journals, sponsored books, specialized conferences, and its convention programs. SPSSI encourages public education and social activism on social issues and facilitates information exchange through its newsletter, social media, and electronic discussion groups. With headquarters in Washington, DC, the Society influences public policy through its publications, congressional briefings, and the advocacy efforts of its members, fellows, and staff. The Society's mission is extended to the global arena by a team of representatives who cover developments at UN headquarters in New York and Geneva. SPSSI has been represented at the United Nations as a Non-Governmental Organization (NGO) since 1987. SPSSI serves as consultant to the UN Economic and Social Council (ECOSOC). An independent society, SPSSI is also Division 9 of the American Psychological Association (APA) and an organizational affiliate of the American Psychological Society (APS).

== History of SPSSI ==
The Society for the Psychological Study of Social Issues (SPSSI) was formally established during the height of the Great Depression, on September 1, 1936, at the annual APA convention at Dartmouth College in Hanover, New Hampshire. Over 100 psychologists attended the meeting where the decision to institute SPSSI was made, in response to a widely felt need to bring the insights of psychological science to bear on contemporary social problems. From the beginning, SPSSI had two primary goals: (1) to encourage research upon those psychological problems most vitally related to modern social, economic and political policies, and (2) to help the public and its representatives understand and use contributions from the scientific investigation of human behavior in the formation of social policies. A guiding spirit was the psychologist Kurt Lewin, a recent German immigrant committed to conducting experiments in real-life conditions in order to capture the interdependence between individuals and what he called their total “life-space.” He championed the concept of “action research” in which the central goal is social change, stating, “Research that produces nothing but books will not suffice.” His spirit of using rigorous social science for social action continues to guide SPSSI and its members.

The organization's interest in both social issues and politics has meant that it is frequently the subject of controversy. In 1942, and subsequently throughout the late 1940s and 1950s, members of SPSSI were investigated by the House Un-American Activities Committee for "subversive activity" based on their political affiliations and areas of research. SPSSI members have also faced episodic attacks on their academic freedom both for their political views and for opposing the imposition of loyalty oaths on university professors.

In 1937, SPSSI inaugurated a tradition of speaking publicly on matters of contemporary politics, when it issued an Armistice Day statement decrying what it saw as a dangerous push toward war. There is “no fighting instinct in man,” it said. Between November 1939 and March 1940, SPSSI issued a total of nine press releases refuting the inevitability of war and highlighting the social psychological processes producing warlike attitudes and the success of propaganda. However, once the U.S. entered the war, SPSSI members engaged in a variety of research and service activities supporting the war-effort. It focused on promoting a scientific understanding of morale, and offered empirical support for the superiority of democracy over totalitarianism.

In 1944, SPSSI issued a statement in support of the work of Ruth Benedict and Gene Weltfish, anthropologists at Columbia University, who wrote a booklet refuting the then-common idea that there are innate racial differences in intelligence. SPSSI commended the booklet's central thesis, “That there is no real evidence for the belief in the innate superiority of any one race over any other, and that racism is therefore superstition.” It was one of SPSSI's first statements against hereditarianism in race science, a cause it has embraced throughout its history. Later that year, SPSSI issued a report that called for a radical restructuring of conventional gender roles in the postwar reconstruction, so that men and women could participate equally in the world of work. The following year, in April 1945, it issued a statement, signed by over 2,000 psychologists, declaring that war is not inherent to human nature.

SPSSI's political activism continued after the war. In 1954, in Brown v Board of Education, the United States Supreme Court ruled that segregation by race was no longer permissible in US schools. In the lower court decisions leading up to the Supreme Court case, many SPSSI members testified as expert witnesses on the side of desegregation. They also prepared an appendix to a legal brief—the Social Science Statement—that summarized the social science evidence in favor of desegregation. Chief Justice Earl Warren referred to this body of evidence as influential in the Court's decision. Not only is Brown v Board considered one of the most important cases in the history of the Supreme Court, it marked one of the first times that the Court considered social science evidence in its deliberations. In 1956, in 1969, and again in 1976, as it first had in 1944, SPSSI published statements opposing the theory of innate racial differences in intelligence. The 1956 statement was signed by 18 prominent social scientists. Its 1969 statement was signed by the entire SPSSI council. It continued episodically through the years to insist that race is a socially constructed category with no significant biological basis, least of all in intelligence. Kenneth B. Clark, whose research with his wife Mamie Phipps Clark on the psychological impact of segregation was essential to the Supreme Court's 1954 Brown decision, served as president of SPSSI in 1959.

In 1966, under the presidency of Jerome Frank (who would become a founder of Physicians for Social Responsibility), SPSSI issued a statement condemning the use of torture by US ally South Vietnam. Frank argued that American indifference to their ally's use of torture was due to “our strong emotional resistance to full perception of facts that are profoundly contradictory to our conception of what American stands for.” He highlighted the “clear finding” that torture served no military purpose, and was in fact counter-productive. Unfortunately, over 40 years later SPSSI would have to revisit the torture issue. In 2007, during the US war in Iraq, SPSSI issued a statement condemning in unequivocal terms America's use of torture and the participation of American psychologists in America's torture program.

The Society continued its work supporting the rights of various groups of minorities with its publication of a special volume of the Journal of Social Issues devoted to women's perspectives in 1972. The volume focused not only on questioning female stereotypes and traditional roles, but also on developing feminist principles which it said “raised fundamental questions regarding present institutions like the family... peace, racism, population, and the environment.” In 1977 it established a Task Force on Sexual Orientation to review the latest social scientific research on homosexuality. The Task Force was a response to what it decried as “a well-financed, conservative backlash against gays and lesbians.”

SPSSI observed its 50th anniversary in 1986 with a celebration in Washington, DC attended by many SPSSI founders and notables and the publication of a two-volume special edition of the Journal of Social Issues devoted to SPSSI's history. The Society became a UN-NGO with observer status in 1987, appointing a representative to the UN whose responsibilities were to report on major international issues to SPSSI and expose UN staff to relevant social science, a mandate that continues to this day. SPSSI gained Consultative status at the UN in 1991, positioning it to author and submit reports directly to the UN's Economic and Social Council, to gain direct access to UN committees, and to have more informal contact with the UN delegates. These activities increase the possibility that the UN will incorporate social and psychological data into its agenda.

The tradition of presenting expert evidence on psychological research regarding stereotyping continued in 1989, when Susan Fiske and other SPSSI members testified in a gender discrimination case. That testimony that was influential at all levels of the case, from the trial and appeal courts to the Supreme Court review.

SPSSI continues to issue statements regarding the major social issues of the day. Recent statements have addressed such issues as the death penalty; global climate change; the psychological effects of unemployment; immigration reform; gay, lesbian bisexual and transgender issues; interpersonal violence; same sex adoption; marriage equality; psychological outcomes of children of same-sex parents; and racial profiling.

SPSSI Current Policy Initiatives

Bringing empirically sound research findings to bear on public policy is at the core of SPSSI's mission. This goal is furthered in many ways, including active engagement in the scientific study of human behavior in critical social situations, sharing the results of that research in scholarly settings, and providing relevant research findings to those engaged in developing public policy. SPSSI members are concerned with both U.S. and international issues, and SPSSI has been affiliated with the United Nations as a Non-Governmental Organization (NGO) since 1987. While SPSSI has focused primarily on U.S. policy in the past, its international membership is constantly growing and international issues have become a larger part of its work.

SPSSI writes policy briefs, sponsors advocacy days, and trains its members on connecting research to policy. In addition, SPSSI operates a Congressional Lunch Seminar series. The meetings equip staffers and lawmakers with the necessary psychological knowledge to provide scientific, empirically supported arguments on social issues. Each seminar has featured a prominent, nationally renowned psychological researcher with particular expertise on a topic of interest. The 2015 topics included Psychological Findings on Sexual Violence on Campus; The Psychology of Immigration in the United States; Engaging the Public in Climate Change Action: Help From the Social and Behavioral Sciences; and Biased Policing: Causes and Consequences. Other congressional briefings, produced by SPSSI's Policy Committee in conjunction with leading researchers, have focused on same-sex marriage, the psychological effects of unemployment, and media violence.

SPSSI also recently promoted new research pertaining to immigration and to gun violence before Congress. It shared scientific findings on the psychological antecedents and consequences of hate crime with lawmakers and civil rights groups. Its members’ research has also been central to a number of amici curiae filed—and evidence submitted—on major Supreme Court cases, including cases pertaining to the integration of public schools (Brown v. Board of Education of Topeka), gender-based stereotyping (Price Waterhouse v. Hopkins) the use of affirmative action in higher education (Grutter v. Bollinger) and the use of the Washington football team's logo (Susan S. Harjo, et al. v. Pro-Football, Inc.). SPSSI also submitted a briefing paper to the President's Special Task Force on Interrogation and Transfer Policies concerning the detrimental effects of the use of torture in interrogation proceedings.

SPSSI supports the post-doctoral James Marshall Public Policy Fellowship and the pre-doctoral Dalmas A. Taylor Summer Minority Policy Internship, to provide public policy experience in Washington, D.C. for qualified applicants. The society also provides funding for policy-related research through Applied Social Issues Internships, Grants-in-Aid, SAGES grants, and Local- and State-Level Policy Work grants.

=== Notable members ===
Gordon Allport (1897 – 1967) was an American psychologist and past president of SPSSI. Allport was one of the first psychologists to focus on the study of the personality, and is often referred to as one of the founding figures of personality psychology. He emphasized the uniqueness of each individual, and the importance of the present context, as opposed to past history, for understanding the personality.

Jerome Bruner (born 1915) is an American psychologist and past president of SPSSI. He has made significant contributions to human cognitive psychology and cognitive learning theory in educational psychology.

Kenneth Clark (1914 –2005) and Mamie Clark (1917 –1983) were African-American psychologists who as a married team conducted important research among children and were active in the Civil Rights Movement. He was a past president of SPSSI. They are best known for their 1940s experiments using dolls to study children's attitudes about race. The Clarks' work contributed to Brown v Board of Education, the ruling of the U.S. Supreme Court in which it determined that de jure racial segregation in public education was unconstitutional.

Morton Deutsch (born 1920), is an American social psychologist and researcher in conflict resolution. Deutsch is one of the founding fathers of the field of conflict resolution and the 63rd most cited psychologist of the 20th century.

Alice H. Eagly (born 1938) is an American psychologist and past president of SPSSI. She is professor of psychology and of management and organizations at Northwestern University Her primary research contributions have been in the area of social psychology, as well as personality psychology and Industrial Organizational Psychology.

Susan Fiske (born 1952) is an American psychologist and Eugene Higgins Professor of Psychology and Public Affairs at the Princeton University Department of Psychology. She is a social psychologist known for her work on social cognition, stereotypes, and prejudice. She gave expert testimony in the landmark case, Hopkins vs. Price Waterhouse, which was eventually heard by the Supreme Court of the United States, making her the first social psychologist to testify in a gender discrimination case.

Marie Jahoda (1907 – 2001) was an Austrian-British social psychologist and past president of SPSSI. Her pioneering research on work found that in modern industrial societies work provides important social benefits, including a sense of personal worth, connection with wider social objectives, and a time structure to people's days and weeks.

Robert Kahn (born 1918) is an American psychologist and past president of SPSSI. He specialized in organizational theory and survey research, having been considered a "founding father" of the modern approach to these disciplines. He has also been involved in developing studies on aging.

Otto Klineberg (1899 – 1992) was a Canadian psychologist and past president of SPSSI. He held professorships in social psychology at Columbia University and the University of Paris. His pioneering work in the 1930s on the intelligence of white and black students in the United States and his evidence as an expert witness in Delaware were instrumental in winning the Supreme Court school segregation case Brown v. Board of Education in 1954.

David Krech (1909 – 1977) was a Russian-born American experimental and social psychologist and past president of SPSSI. Krech collaborated with social psychologist Richard Crutchfield in writing what was then a revolutionary book in social psychology. Published in 1948, Theory and Problems of Social Psychology gave social psychology for the first time a theoretical base in the psychology of perception and, most notably, in Gestalt psychology.

Kurt Lewin (1890 –1947) was a German-American psychologist and past president of SPSSI. He is known as one of the modern pioneers of social, organizational, and applied psychology in the United States. Rensis Likert was an American administrator and organizational psychologist and past president of SPSSI. He is best known for his work in developing the 5-point Likert Scale, a form of self-reported questionnaire.

Gardner Murphy (1895 – 1979) was an American psychologist and past president of SPSSI. He specialized in social and personality psychology, and parapsychology. His career highlights included serving as president of both the American Psychological Association and the British Society for Psychical Research.

Georgene Hoffman Seward (1902 – 1992), an early feminist psychologist, was best known for her research on sex roles and sex behavior. Having experienced much sex discrimination in academia herself, she dedicated her life to researching sex differences, minority experiences, and encouraging women to pursue leadership in science.

Mahlon Smith (1919 – 2012) was an American psychologist and past president of SPSSI. Smith testified against segregation in schools as an expert witness in the Brown v. Board of Education case and in 1986 won the Society's Kurt Lewin Award.

Goodwin Watson (1899 – 1976) was an American psychologist and founding member and first president of SPSSI. His primary interest was the use of psychological research to address social issues and effect change society. In pursuit of that goal, Watson helped found the SPSSI in 1936, served as its first president and remained a contributing member for the remainder of his career.

=== SPSSI Presidents since 1936 ===
1936 Goodwin Watson
1937 Gardner Murphy
1938 George W. Hartmann
1939 Edward C. Tolman
1940 Floyd Allport
1941 Kurt Lewin
1942 Otto Klineberg
1943 Gordon W. Allport
1944 Ernest R. Hilgard
1945 Theodore Newcomb
1946 Rensis Likert
1947 Hadley Cantril
1948 Ronald O. Lippitt
1949 Daniel Katz
1950 David Krech
1951 Stuart W. Cook
1952 Dorwin Cartwright
1953 Eugene Hartley
1954 S. Stansfeld Sargent
1955 Marie Jahoda
1956 Alvin F. Zander
1957 R. Nevitt Sanford
1958 M. Brewster Smith
1959 Kenneth Clark
1960 Morton Deutsch
1961 Isidor Chein
1962 John R. P. French Jr.
1963 Jerome S. Bruner
1964 Herbert C. Kelman
1965 Jerome D. Frank
1966 Milton Rokeach
1967 Thomas Pettigrew
1968 Martin Deutsch
1969 Robert Chin
1970 Robert L. Kahn
1971 Marcia Guttentag
1972 Harold M. Proshansky
1973 Bertram H. Raven
1974 Albert Pepitone
1975 Harry C. Triandis
1976 Ezra Stotland
1977 Lawrence Wrightsman
1978 June Louin Tapp
1979 Cynthia Deutsch
1980 Leonard Bickman
1981 Clara Weiss Mayo
1982 Martha Mednick
1983 Lois W. Hoffman
1984 Marilynn Brewer
1985 Joseph McGrath
1986 Phyllis Katz
1987 Jeffery Z. Rubin
1988 Seymour Feshbach
1989 Jacqueline Goodchilds
1990 Stanley Sue
1991 Faye Crosby
1992 Sally Shumaker
1993 Stuart Oskamp
1994 Virginia O'Leary
1995 Michele Wittig
1996 Dalmas Taylor
1997 Barbara Gutek
1998 Rhoda Unger
1999 John Dovidio
2000 Jenny Crocker
2001 Geoffrey Maruyama
2002 Louis Penner
2003 James M. Jones
2004 Kay Deaux
2005 Marybeth Shinn
2006 Irene Hanson Frieze
2007 Daniel Perlman
2008 Susan Opotow
2009 Eugene Borgida
2010 James Jackson
2011 Maureen O'Connor (psychologist)
2012 Allen Omoto
2013 Dominic Abrams
2014 Alice Eagly
2015 Susan Clayton
2016 Chris Crandall
2017 Wendy Williams
2018 Elizabeth R. Cole
2019 Stephanie Fryberg
2020 Keon West
2021 Linda Silka
2022 Abigail Stewart
2023 Patrick R. Grzanka
2024 Heather Bullock
2025 Kimberly Barsamian Kahn

== Membership ==
=== Organization ===
There are four different memberships one can have in SPSSI.

- Full Member
- Student Member
- Life Member
- Sustaining Member

SPSSI also offers Fellow positions. This is a respected title throughout the Society that persons deserving of recognition for excellent improvement of the psychological aspects of social issues and the Society can be elected for. There are three types of Fellows in SPSSI; members who belong to APA, members of SPSSI who are already Fellows of different APA divisions, and members who don't belong to APA. Qualifications include being a SPSSI/APA member for at least one year and example of "unusual or outstanding contributions or performance" in psychology or specified area (for SPSSI). The process to become a SPSSI Fellow begins with a nomination, by an existing member or by self-nominating, followed by an application process. There is a review of nominee's work and at least three supporting letters from current Fellows that evaluate the contributions.

=== Member responsibilities and qualifications ===
Full member requires doctoral degree in a psychological (or other related field to the society) from an accredited program. Student members extend to both graduate and undergraduate students studying in a discipline related to the organization. Both of these memberships require annual fees; full members vary in price from $40 - $100. The student membership is $25 a year. Life Members are members who have aged to sixty-five while maintaining Full Member status for twenty years. Once approved, they will no longer have dues and maintain all rights of being a full member. Full members under the age of sixty-five can request for Sustaining Member status. This is where they would make a one-time membership fee and retain their status for life. This status and the amount is decided upon by the society's council.

=== Member benefits ===
For those who become members of SPSSI reap many benefits directly from the group including subscriptions to all journals and newsletters published by SPSSI (Journal of Social Issues, Analyses of Social Issues and Public Policy, & Social Issues and Policy Review). A 25% discount is applied to all books published by them and Wiley. Discounts are also applied to SPSSI conference registration fees for members. Within the society, members are allowed to partake in annual voting and have access to the membership directory. Benefits also include access to participate on the Society's forum, which consistently has open discussions on new topics, review or plans of upcoming events, job postings and other topics.

== Awards ==
=== Applied Social Issues Internship ===
The Applied Social Issues Internship is awarded to any undergraduate, graduate, first-year post doctorates that are studying psychology, applied social sciences, and other similar fields.

=== The Clara Mayo Grants ===
The Clara Mayo Grant awards SPSSI members who are enrolled in graduate programs in psychology, applied social sciences, other similar fields, and who are researching the realm of sexism, racism, or prejudice.

=== Crosby-Spendlove Travel Grant ===
The Crosby Spendlove Award is given to a graduate student enrolled in either a Master's or PhD program that is the first or sole author on a presentation for the SPSSI Biennial Conference. Preference is given to a student who is presenting research coming from a feminist and social justice perspective.

=== Grants-in-Aid Program ===
The Grants-in-Aid award is given to a graduate student who is proposing to research social problem areas that are not likely to receive support from other traditional sources.

=== Gordon Allport Intergroup Relations Prize ===
The Gordon Allport Prize is given to the best paper of that year that focused on intergroup relations.

=== Other notable awards ===
Innovative Teaching Award , Louise Kidder Early Career Award , The Michele Alexander Early Career Award for Scholarship and Service , The Otto Klineberg Intercultural and International Relations Award , SPSSI Awards for Outstanding Teaching and Mentoring , The Kurt Lewin Award , The Social Issues Dissertation Award , The Sages Program , Small-Scale Events Advancing SPSSI (SEAS) Grants , SPSSI Teaching Award

== Publications ==
- Journal of Social Issues
- Analyses of Social Issues and Public Policy
- Social Issues and Policy Review

SPSSI also publishes both authored and edited books. Authored books are grounded in programs of research and focus on psychological research relevant to social issues facing individuals, groups, communities, and/or society at large. Edited books help to fill the gap between basic research on social issues and translation into social policy and program interventions.
