= John Pachankis =

American clinical psychologist

- Born: Shreveport, Louisiana

Academic background
- Education: Loyola University; MA, PhD, Stony Brook University

John E. Pachankis (born 1980/1981) is an American clinical psychologist. He is the David R. Kessler Professor at the Yale School of Public Health. His research documents the social and emotional experiences of LGBT individuals, including reasons for this population's greater risk of depression and suicide, and has developed among the first evidence-based mental health treatments to reduce this risk.

== Education and career ==
Pachankis was born and raised in Shreveport, Louisiana. He completed his undergraduate education at Loyola University New Orleans and earned his PhD in clinical psychology (quantitative focus) at Stony Brook University in 2008 as a student of Marvin Goldfried. Upon completing his clinical internship at McLean Hospital, Harvard Medical School, Pachankis accepted an assistant professor position at the Ferkauf Graduate School of Psychology at Yeshiva University. Pachankis joined the faculty at the Yale School of Public Health in the Department of Social and Behavioral Sciences in 2013 and received tenure in 2018. He has secondary appointments in the Departments of Psychiatry and Psychology.

Pachankis directs the Yale LGBTQ Mental Health Initiative, which "provides a home for scholars and scholarship devoted to understanding and improving the mental health of LGBTQ populations in the US and around the world."

== Scientific contributions ==
Pachankis' research laboratory uses experiments, longitudinal cohort studies, and clinical trials to study how LGBT people are affected by their social environments and to develop evidence-based strategies for reducing LGBT people's disproportionate risk of depression, anxiety, suicidality, and high-risk substance use.

=== Sexual orientation concealment ===
Across his career, Pachankis has studied the social determinants and psychological consequences of concealing one's sexual orientation. With Richard Bränström, he estimated that the majority of the world's sexual minority population is closeted, as a function of anti-LGBT laws, policies, and attitudes across much of the world. With Mark Hatzenbuehler, he found that the length of time that gay and bisexual men spend in the closet is associated with the degree to which their self-worth is contingent on external sources of approval and status, the so-called "Best Little Boy in the World" hypothesis. This study also found that investing one's self-worth in external sources of regard was associated with loneliness, negative mood, and dishonesty. Pachankis has conducted some of the few population-based studies of the closet, finding that the mental health correlates of not being out differ by gender and social support. In a meta-analysis of 193 studies, his team found a small positive association between sexual orientation concealment and poor mental health and a small negative association between sexual orientation concealment and substance use and highlighted several methodological limitations of existing research on sexual orientation concealment.

=== LGBTQ-affirmative psychotherapy ===
Pachankis has been a leader in the LGBT-affirmative psychotherapy movement, having developed one of the only mental health treatments for sexual minority people to have been tested in randomized controlled trials. This treatment is based in cognitive-behavioral therapy and is informed by identity-affirming principles and techniques. In waitlist trials, the treatment has shown significant reductions in depression, high-risk alcohol use, and HIV-transmission-risk behavior. This treatment has been adapted for sexual minority women, Black and Latinx gay and bisexual men (with Skyler Jackson), Chinese gay and bisexual men (with Xianhong Li and Si Pan), and Romanian gay and bisexual men (with Corina Lelutiu-Weinberger). He has worked with community organizations in the US and several other countries to implement this evidence-based LGBT-affirmative mental health treatment in local settings. As a result of this research, Pachankis received the 2017 American Psychological Association Division 44 Distinguished Scientific Contributions Award for his contributions to LGBT psychology. and the 2018 American Psychological Association Award for Distinguished Contributions to Psychology in the Public Interest. Pachankis co-edited the Handbook of Evidence-Based Practice with Sexual and Gender Minorities, which received the Distinguished Book Award from Division 44 of the American Psychological Association.

=== Gay community stress theory ===
Pachankis proposed gay community stress theory, suggesting that gay and bisexual men face exacerbated masculine-based status pressures and competition because they seek social and sexual reward from other men. Across a series of qualitative, survey, and experimental studies, Pachankis and colleagues found partial support for this theory. For instance, gay and bisexual men with low social status who were rejected in a simulated online chatroom experienced more felt rejection if they were rejected by gay men rather than heterosexual men. In survey research, experiences of gay community stress (i.e., stress emanating from the gay community's focus on sex, status, competition, and exclusion of diversity) are associated with poorer mental health and more risk-taking even when controlling for experiences of stigma-based stress from heterosexual people. These findings have been used to influence social media apps to take steps to address the stigma that takes place on them.
