= Kay Deaux =

American social psychologist

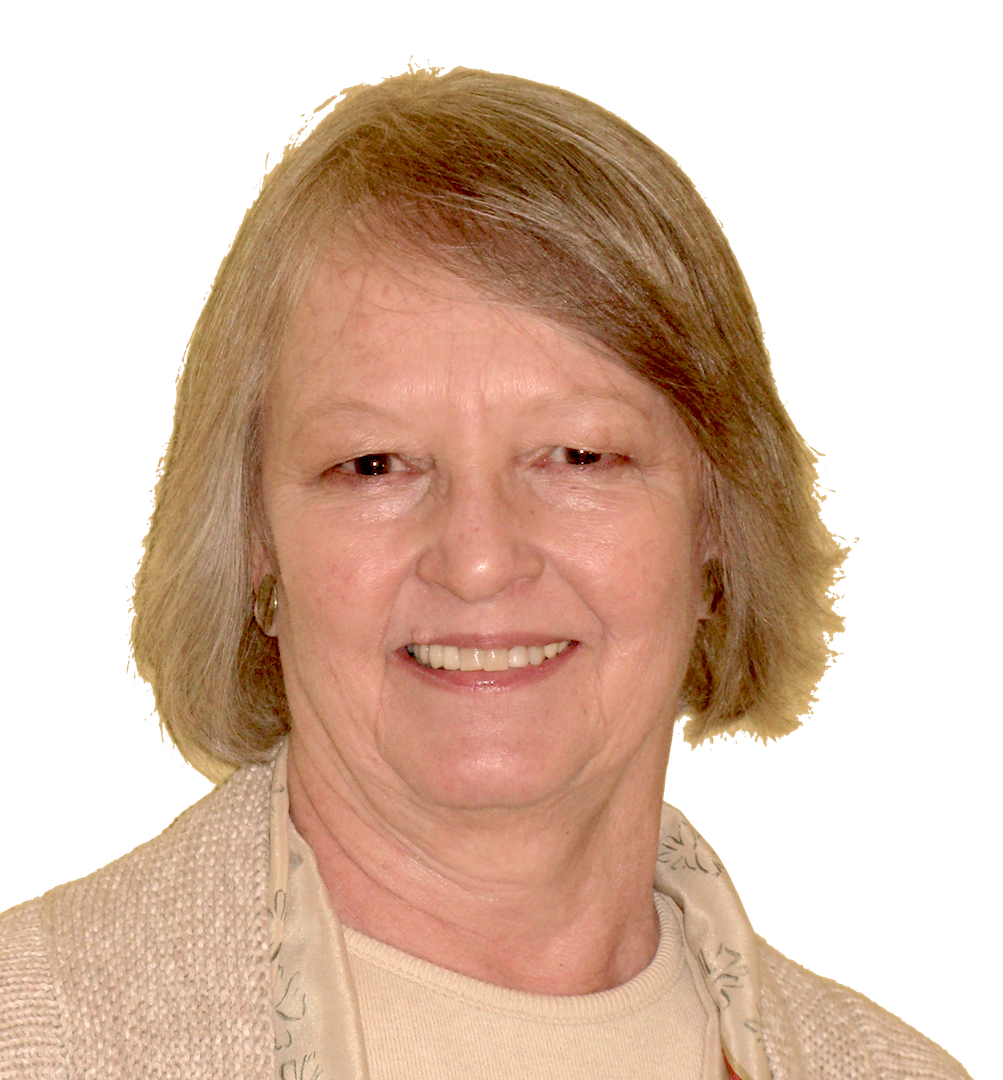
- Citizenship: American
- Occupation: Distinguished Professor Emerita
- Spouse: Sam Glucksberg
- Awards: SPSSI Gordon Allport Intergroup Relations Prize (1987); APA Division 35's Carolyn Wood Sherif Award (1987); APA Division 35's Heritage Research Award (1993); APA Committee on Women in Psychology Leadership Award (2001); SPSSI Kurt Lewin Award (2007); Society for Personality and Social Psychology Distinguished Scholar Award (2016)

Academic background
- Education: Northwestern University, University of Texas at Austin

Kay Deaux (born 1941) is an American social psychologist known for her pioneering research on immigration and feminist identity. Deaux is Distinguished Professor Emerita at the Department of Psychology at the Graduate Center of the City University of New York (CUNY). According to Brenda Major, Deaux's work centers on the question of how social categories affect one's psychological makeup, social behavior, and life outcomes, while emphasizing the subjectivity of people's identities and experiences and the larger social context.

Deaux is well known for her work in immigration and gender issues, and her encouragement of social psychologists to study how issues of identity, ethnicity, inter-group contact, attitudes and motivation play out in the immigration process. She is the author of three books related to her research surrounding immigration and feminism: To Be an Immigrant, The Behavior of Women and Men, and Women of Steel: Female Blue-collar Workers in the Steel Industry. She served as senior editor (with Mark Snyder) of the Oxford Handbook of Personality and Social Psychology. Other edited volumes include Representations of the Social: Bridging Theoretical Traditions (with Gina Philogène), Social Psychology in the Seventies (with Lawrence Wrightsman), Social Psychology in the Eighties (with Lawrence Wrightsman), and Social Psychology in the '90s (with Francis Dane).

== Career ==
Deaux completed her undergraduate education at Northwestern University, graduating with departmental honors in Psychology in 1963. She continued her education at the University of Texas at Austin, where she completed her PhD in Social Psychology in 1967, with her dissertation titled The effects of warning on information preference and attitude change.

Deaux faced many obstacles in her career. She was the only female professor at a graduate school and was turned down for multiple jobs. She got her first faculty position at Wright State University where she was an assistant professor from 1967 to 1970. She faced discrimination after realizing she was paid significantly less than her male counterparts. Deaux was a member of the faculty of psychology at Purdue University from 1970 to 1987 before moving to the CUNY Graduate Center in 1987.

Deaux served as president of the Association for Psychological Science from 1997 to 1998 and president of the Society for the Psychological Study of Social Issues from 2004 to 2005. She was a visiting scholar at the Russell Sage Foundation and served on the Advisory Committee on Cultural Contact and Immigration for the foundation.

== Awards ==
- 2016 Distinguished Scholar Award from the Society for Personality and Social Psychology
- 2007 Kurt Lewin Memorial Award from the Society for the Psychological Study of Social Issues, distinguished address titled To be American: Immigration, Hyphenation, and Incorporation
- 2001 American Psychological Association (APA) Committee on Women in Psychology Leadership Award The award citation noted that "Dr. Deaux's pioneering scholarship on women and gender combines elegant and rigorous research design with insightful analysis of women's life experiences. Her work has fundamentally shaped the study of gender in all its complexities [...] Dr. Deaux was among the first to direct psychology's attention to the problems of blue-collar women, reflecting her tireless commitment to bettering women's lives."
- 1993 APA Heritage Research Award
- 1987 APA Carolyn Wood Sherif Award

== Research ==
Deaux's research and writing interests center on the social psychological aspects of immigration, and in particular the issues that immigrants face in negotiating identities in new circumstances. Examples of this work include stereotype threat processes among West Indian immigrants in the United States and Turkish immigrants in Germany, the relation of ethnic identity to social/political beliefs, support for collective action and the development of national identity. She has a career-long interest in gender, including issues combining gender and immigration.

Deaux began to shy away from traditional research to focus on issues related to sexism in the workplace, feminism and other gender issues. She helped start a Women's Program at Purdue University. Her research on stereotypes and discriminatory practices was used in a US Supreme Court case.

Deaux researched men's patriarchal role in society and the earliest mentions of sexist behavior, specifically in religion. Her work compares these traditional roles and behaviors with modern stereotypes and today's gender roles. The practices that Deaux studies include how women rely on men financially and for physical protection.

Deaux wrote about immigration and self-esteem and found that immigrants have no regard for White Americans' perception of their culture due to repeat appraisal from members of the same cultural heritage.

== Selected articles ==
- Ashmore, R. D., Deaux, K., & McLaughlin-Volpe, T. (2004). An organizing framework for collective identity: articulation and significance of multidimensionality. Psychological Bulletin, 130(1), pages 80–114.
- Deaux, K. (2000). Surveying the landscape of immigration: Social psychological perspectives. Journal of Community & Applied Social Psychology, 10(5), 421–431.
- Deaux, K. (2006). A nation of immigrants: Living our legacy. Journal of Social issues, 62(3), pages 633–651.
- Deaux, K., Bikmen, N., Gilkes, A., Ventuneac, A., Joseph, Y., Payne, Y. A., & Steele, C. M. (2007). Becoming American: Stereotype threat effects in Afro-Caribbean immigrant groups. Social Psychology Quarterly, 70(4), pages 384–404.
- Deaux, K., & Major, B. (1987). Putting gender into context: An interactive model of gender-related behavior. Psychological Review, 94(3), pages 369–389.
- Deaux, K., Reid, A., Martin, D., & Bikmen, N. (2006). Ideologies of diversity and inequality: Predicting collective action in groups varying in ethnicity and immigrant status. Political Psychology, 27(1), pages 123–146.

== Bibliography ==
- Deaux, K. (2001). Social Psychology Network: Kay Deaux. Social Psychology. 1(1).
- Gul, Pelin. (2010). Feminist Psychology: Kay Deaux. Feminist Voices. 1(1).
