= Marcia Guttentag =

American clinical social psychologist

- Occupation: Social Psychologist
- Spouse: Paul Secord
- Awards: Fellow, American Association for the Advancement of Science; University Academy of Distinction, Adelphi University

Academic background
- Education: University of Michigan; Adelphi University

Academic work
- Institutions: Queens College, CUNY; Harvard University

Marcia Guttentag (November 9, 1932 – November 4, 1977) was clinical social psychologist whose work focused on psychological issues related to children, poverty, women's rights, and mental health. As one of the founders of the Evaluation Research Society, Guttentag is known for being a pioneer in promoting evaluation research as a distinct field of social science. She was an elected Fellow of the American Association for the Advancement of Science.

In 1971, Guttentag became the second woman to be elected as president of the Society for the Psychological Study of Social Issues (SPSSI). During her presidency she edited two issues of the Journal of Social Issues. Guttentag was one of the founders of the Society for Personality and Social Psychology (American Psychological Association, Division 8) and served a term as its president. She contributed her efforts to other professional organizations including UNESCO, the New York State Psychological Association, the New York Academy of Sciences, the American Sociological Association, and the Society for Experimental Social Psychology.

The American Evaluation Association named its Promising New Evaluator Award in honor of Guttentag. Adelphi University elected Guttentag to its University Academy of Distinction as a distinguished alumna in 1975.

== Biography ==
Guttentag was born in New York on November 9, 1932. She attended the University of Michigan and received her B.A degree in psychology in 1953. At the University of Michigan, Guttentag was recognized for her academic achievements and named M. Robinson Hawkins Scholar. After graduating, she participated the Fulbright Exchange Program and traveled to the University of Freilberg. She subsequently worked as a National Institute of Mental Health fellow at Harvard University.

Guttentag obtained her Ph.D. in clinical psychology at Adelphi University in 1960. She wrote her thesis The Effect of Verbal Reinforcement and Word Frequency on Visual Duration Thresholds, under the supervision of Harry I. Kalish.

From 1960–1965, Guttentag had academic positions at multiple universities before joining the faculty of Queens College in 1966. For much of her career, Guttentag was a professor of psychology at Queens College and the Graduate School and University Center of City University of New York (CUNY). In 1972, she left CUNY to work at Harvard University where she was Director of the Social Development Research Center and the Center for Evaluation Research. During the mid-1970's, Guttentag initiated several major projects that stemmed from her advocacy for women's rights, including the Families and Stress Research Project, funded by the National Institute of Mental Health. In 1975, Guttentag co-edited (with Elmer Struening) the two-volume Handbook of Evaluation Research which served as a reference guide to research methodology in what was then a new field of study (Volume 1), with the methodology illustrated using case-studies of evaluation research (Volume 2).

Guttentag died suddenly of a heart attack on November 4, 1977.

== Research ==
At the time of her death, Guttentag was writing a manuscript for a book on the societal implications of imbalanced sex-ratios, which her husband Paul Secord later completed (with co-authorship). Too Many Women?: The Sex Ratio Question explored possible effects of sex ratios on social systems and human relationships, and argued that these ratios have profound effects on societal values and treatment of women. The project began in 1975 after Guttentag and her family had watched Mozart’s The Magic Flute. As compared to popular music of the 1970s, The Magic Flute and other songs of the classical period were much more romantic, glorifying courtship and the institution of marriage. She subsequently examined census data from towns in late 19th-century, and observed that the sex ratio at birth for seven of eight ethnic groups was around 106 males for every 100 females (the outlier being Jewish communities where the sex-ratio even more strongly favored males). In contrast, in the 1970s, the sex-ratio of adult men to adult women in the United States had dropped below 1.0. Guttentag concluded from her research that when men outnumbered women, marriages tended to be most stable, whereas when women outnumbered men, women were more likely to be treated as sex objects and experience divorce, but also more likely to work outside of the home and have increased political rights. Her thesis that sex-ratios have broad impact on social behavior aligns well with more recent work drawing links between sex-ratios and male-female power dynamics and sexual behavior.

== Books ==
- Guttentag, M., & Bray, H. (1976). Undoing sex stereotypes: Research and resources for educators . McGraw-Hill.
- Guttentag, M., Oglesby, M., Kiresuk, T., & Cahn, J. (1975). The evaluation of training in mental health. New York: Behavioral Publications.
- Guttentag, M., Salasin, S., & Belle, D. (Eds.). (1980). The mental health of women (Vol. 23). Academic Press.
- Guttentag, M., & Secord, P. F. (1983). Too many women?: The sex ratio question . Sage.
- Struening, E.L., & Guttentag, M. (1975). Handbook of evaluation research . Sage.

== Representative publications ==
- Denmark, F. L., & Guttentag, M. (1967). Dissonance in the self-concepts and educational concepts of college-and non-college-oriented women. Journal of Counseling Psychology, 14(2), 113–115.
- Guttentag, M. (1971). Models and methods in evaluation research. Journal for the Theory of Social Behaviour, 1(1), 75–93.
- Guttentag, M. (1973). Evaluation of social intervention programs. Annals of the New York Academy of Sciences 218(1), 3–13.
- Guttentag, M. (1976). Evaluation and society. Personality and Social Psychology Bulletin, 3(1), 31–40.
- Guttentag, M., & Ross, S. (1972). Movement responses in simple concept learning. American Journal of Orthopsychiatry, 42(4), 657–665.
