= James Jones (psychologist) =

James M. Jones
- Born: James McCoy Jones
- Education: Oberlin College; Temple University; Yale University
- Awards: Guggenheim Fellowship (1973–74); Outstanding Lifetime Contributions to Psychology Award from the American Psychological Association (2011); Gold Medal Award for Life Contributions to Psychology in the Public Interest from the American Psychological Foundation (2018)
- Scientific career
- Fields: Social psychology
- Institutions: University of Delaware
- Thesis: Cognitive Factors in the Appreciation of Humor: A Theoretical and Experimental Analysis (1970)

James McCoy Jones is an African-American social psychologist and cultural diversity scholar. He is Trustees' Distinguished Professor Emeritus of Psychological and Brain Sciences and Black American Studies and Director of the Center for the Study of Diversity at the University of Delaware. He is a past president of both the Society of Experimental Social Psychology and the Society for the Psychological Study of Social Issues. He previously taught at Harvard University and Howard University before joining the University of Delaware. In 2011, he received the Outstanding Lifetime Contributions to Psychology Award from the American Psychological Association. He retired from the University of Delaware in 2018, and gave a retirement lecture on diversity on April 16 of that year.

== Selected publications ==
- Prejudice and Racism (1972, second edition in 1997)
- The Psychology of Diversity: Beyond prejudice and racism, with co-authors John Dovidio and Deborah Vietze, 2014.
