= M. Brewster Smith =

American psychologist (1919–2012)

- Born: June 26, 1919; Syracuse, New York, U.S.
- Died: August 4, 2012 (aged 93); Santa Cruz, California, U.S.
- Education: Harvard University
- Known for: Testimony in Brown v. Board of Education
- Scientific career
- Fields: Social psychology
- Thesis: Functional and descriptive analysis of public opinion (1947)

Mahlon Brewster Smith (June 26, 1919 – August 4, 2012) was an American psychologist and past president of the American Psychological Association. His career included faculty appointments at Vassar College, New York University, University of California, Berkeley, University of Chicago and University of California, Santa Cruz. Smith had been briefly involved with the Young Communist League as a student at Reed College in the 1930s, which resulted in a subpoena by the U.S. Senate in the 1950s. That activity caused him to be blacklisted by the National Institute of Mental Health for ten years without his knowledge.

Smith testified against segregation in schools as an expert witness in the Brown v. Board of Education case; the scope and scientific basis for Smith's testimony have been the subjects of controversy. He was the vice president of the Joint Commission on Mental Illness and Health, the group whose recommendations led to the deinstitutionalization of most of the mentally ill in the United States. In 1961, he helped to interview and select the first group of Peace Corps volunteers.

Smith authored several notable works in social psychology, and a collection of his works was published in 2003. He was editor of two major psychological journals and was the recipient of numerous awards, including the Kurt Lewin Award from the Society for the Psychological Study of Social Issues and the APA Award for Distinguished Contributions to Psychology in the Public Interest. Smith died in 2012 after a brief illness.

== Early life ==
Mahlon Brewster Smith was born on June 26, 1919, in Syracuse, New York. When he was a child, his family moved to Oregon after his father became a dean at Oregon State University. Smith enrolled at Reed College at the age of 16 and attended for two years. He earned undergraduate and master's degrees from Stanford University, then started a doctoral program at Harvard University before being drafted into the U.S. Army.

In the military, Smith tested and interviewed personnel, earning a Bronze Star and being promoted to major. Smith's experiences during World War II inspired his future involvement in a movement known as peace psychology. He returned to Harvard and finished graduate school in 1947.

== Career ==
After graduation from Harvard, Smith was a professor and department chair at Vassar College. He then worked for the Social Science Research Council for several years. Between 1956 and 1959, he taught at New York University and headed the psychology graduate program. He moved to the University of California, Berkeley. In 1961, he interviewed and helped to select the first group of Peace Corps volunteers; he traveled to Ghana to visit them multiple times.

Smith directed Berkeley's Institute of Human Development from 1965 to 1968. After serving as department head at the University of Chicago for two years, he came to the University of California, Santa Cruz in 1970. He was dean of social sciences for five years, then was a professor of psychology until his retirement in 1988. At UC Santa Cruz, he influenced a focus on social justice in the social psychology program.

=== Young Communist League involvement ===
In the 1950s, Smith was subpoenaed to appear before a U.S. Senate committee on Communist activities. While he was enrolled at Reed College in the mid-1930s, he had become involved with the Young Communist League. He ceased his involvement with the organization in the late 1930s, but he later found out that he had been on a National Institute of Mental Health blacklist for ten years.

=== Organizational leadership ===
Smith served as president of the American Psychological Association (APA). He also led or founded several APA sections, including the Division on Humanistic Psychology, the Division on Theoretical and Philosophical Psychology, the Society for the Psychological Study of Social Issues (SPSSI) and the Society for the Study of Peace, Conflict and Violence. Smith served stints as editor for the Journal of Social Issues and the Journal of Abnormal and Social Psychology. He was the president of Psychologists for Social Responsibility for the two years before his retirement.

=== Brown v. Board of Education ===
In 1954, Smith provided expert testimony in Brown v. Board of Education which characterized segregation as "inherently an insult to the integrity of the individual". He was one of several social scientists who testified in favor of integration during the four trials that were combined into Brown. Henry Garrett, a former APA president and professor at Columbia University, was the only psychologist who testified for the state. He characterized Smith's testimony as naïve and said that psychologists like Smith had stepped outside of social science when testifying on the effects of segregation.

The testimony of Smith and his colleagues has been the subject of ongoing controversy. University of Colorado professor John P. Jackson Jr. writes, "Within 40 years, what was once viewed as psychology’s greatest achievement in social engineering has been proclaimed a miserable failure. The psychologists involved in Brown are often viewed as liberal reformers who masked their political wishes in the guise of social science."

Historian James T. Patterson says that the evidence for their testimony was "dubious and subject to different interpretations... The fact of the matter was that in 1954 there simply did not exist sufficient research that could 'prove' whether any particular racial mix in schools was superior – or in what ways – to any other." Jackson argues that segregationist writers of the time "succeeded in framing the issues in a manner that put the actions of the social scientists in the worst possible light."

=== Joint Commission on Mental Illness and Health ===
Smith was the vice president of the Joint Commission on Mental Illness and Health, an independent organization created by the United States Congress in 1955 to study the care of the nation's mentally ill. The group's final report is thought to have influenced legislation that led to the deinstitutionalization of the American mentally ill. The report, Action for Mental Health (1961), advocated for community-based mental health care. It recommended that no mental hospitals should be constructed with more than 1,000 beds and that existing hospitals of greater than 1,000 beds should be converted to centers treating chronic physical and mental conditions.

By the 1980s, the group's report was criticized for leading to deinstitutionalization in large numbers without establishing sufficient community resources for the mentally ill and for the subsequent overreliance on psychiatric drugs. Charles Schlaifer, a member of the group, said that he later became frustrated because "tranquilizers became the panacea for the mentally ill... Local mental health centers were going to be the greatest thing going, but no one wanted to think it through." Smith admitted that "extravagant claims were made for the benefits of shifting from state hospitals to community clinics. The professional community made mistakes and was overly optimistic, but the political community wanted to save money."

== Later life ==
Smith received the 1986 Kurt Lewin Award from SPSSI; the award recognizes "outstanding contributions to the development and integration of psychological research and social action". In 1988, he received the APA Award for Distinguished Contributions to Psychology in the Public Interest. Smith was active in social psychology even after his retirement from UC Santa Cruz.

The Western Psychological Association awarded Smith its first Lifetime Service Award in 1996. In 2003, he published For a Significant Social Psychology: The Collected Writings of M. Brewster Smith. In 2006, SPSSI recognized him again with its Award for Distinguished Theoretical and Philosophical Contributions to Psychology. He died in Santa Cruz on August 4, 2012, after a brief hospital stay.

== Selected works ==
=== Books ===
- The American Soldier
- Opinions and Personality (1956)
- Humanizing Social Psychology (1974)
- Values, Self and Psychology (1991)
- For a Significant Social Psychology: The Collected Writings of M. Brewster Smith (2003)

=== Journal articles ===
- McCarthyism: A Personal Account, Journal of Social Issues, 1986.
