= Norbert Schwarz =

German psychologist

- Born: March 28, 1953 (age 73); Annweiler, Germany
- Known for: Feelings as Information
- Awards: Recipient of Wilhelm Wundt Medal, Thomas M. Ostrom Award of the Person Memory Interest Group, Wilhelm Wundt - William James Award, Distinguished Scientific Contribution Award of Society for Consumer Psychology, Donald T. Campbell Award of Society for Personality and Social Psychology, Distinguished Scientist Award of Society for Experimental Social Psychology, Rackham Distinguished Graduate Mentor Award]; Dr. honoris causa, University of Basel, Switzerland
- Scientific career
- Fields: Psychology, Marketing, Survey methodology
- Workplaces: University of Southern California; University of Michigan; University of Heidelberg; GESIS; University of Mannheim

Norbert Schwarz is Provost Professor in the Department of Psychology and the USC Marshall School of Business at the University of Southern California and a co-director of the USC Dornsife Mind and Society Center.

== Education ==
He received a Ph.D. in sociology from the University of Mannheim, Germany (1980) and a habilitation in psychology from the University of Heidelberg, Germany (1986).

== Academic career ==
Schwarz taught at the University of Heidelberg from 1981 to 1992 and served as Scientific Director of ZUMA, now GESIS, an interdisciplinary social science research center (1987–1992). From 1993 to 2013, he worked at the University of Michigan, Ann Arbor, where he held appointments as the Charles Horton Cooley Collegiate Professor of Psychology in the Social Psychology program, Professor of Marketing at the Ross School of Business, Research Professor in the Program in Survey Methodology, and Research Professor at the Institute for Social Research.

A bibliometric analysis lists him among the 0.1% most frequently cited scientists across all fields of science in the Scopus database, 1997-2017.

=== Research ===
A core theme of his work is that people do not have stable, coherent and readily accessible attitudes that can be reliably measured through self-report. Instead, opinions are constructed on the spot and recent, contextual factors exert a disproportionate influence on judgments. These influences include feelings (such as moods, emotions, and metacognitive experiences), inferences about the meaning implicit in questions, and whether feelings and thoughts are used to form a representation of the target of judgment or the standard against which it is compared.

==== Feelings as information ====
Norbert Schwarz proposed the "feelings-as-information" hypothesis, an influential explanation for the cognitive consequences of affect. According to this perspective, when people make judgments about a target, they rely upon their feelings as diagnostic information about the target of judgment. Although this generally produces accurate responses, people sometimes make mistakes about the source of this information. This hypothesis is well demonstrated by mood effects where people tend to evaluate various targets more positively when they are in a good mood than in a bad mood. For instance, people report higher life satisfaction when they are in a good mood on a sunny day rather than in a bad mood on a rainy day. However, if the interviewer mentions the weather before they ask the life satisfaction question, this mood effect disappears because people accurately attribute their current mood to the weather rather than their life satisfaction.

==== Gricean Maxims and survey response ====
Norbert Schwarz is also known for his research on cognitive processes underlying survey response. This work generally treats the survey interview context as a conversation between the researcher and the respondent. According to this logic, surveys are governed by the cooperative principle advanced by Paul Grice, the late philosopher of language. Put simply, the cooperative principle states that people try to communicate clearly and truthfully, in as much detail as required (but not more so), giving only relevant information. Schwarz's research implicates the operation of these maxims during various stages of the survey question and answering process, and highlights how features of the research instrument can significantly impact the answers obtained. For example, when asked about how successful their lives have been, individuals' responses depended on the range of a scale. "When the numeric values ranged from 0 ('not at all successful') to 10 ('extremely successful'), 34 percent of the respondents endorsed values between 0 and 5. However, only 13 percent endorsed formally equivalent values between -5 and 0, when the scale ranged from -5 ('not at all successful') to +5 ('extremely successful')."

=== Views on the replication crisis ===
Schwartz has characterized those who highlight the replication crisis in social psychology and propose reforms to scientific conduct as engaging in a "witch hunt".
