= Faye Crosby =

American social psychologist

- Born: Faye Jacqueline Newman; July 12, 1947 (age 78)
- Education: Wheaton College; Boston University
- Known for: Research on affirmative action
- Awards: Carolyn Wood Sherif Award from Division 35 of the American Psychological Association; Kurt Lewin Award from the Society for the Psychological Study of Social Issues
- Scientific career
- Fields: Social psychology
- Institutions: University of California, Santa Cruz
- Thesis: The effect of mode of interaction, sex, and acquaintance on conversation management (1976)

Faye J. Crosby (née Faye Jacqueline Newman; born July 12, 1947) is an American social psychologist and professor in the Department of Psychology at the University of California, Santa Cruz. Her research has focused on topics related to social justice, particularly affirmative action, as well as gender equality and relative deprivation. Before joining the University of California, Santa Cruz, she taught at Yale University and at Smith College. In 2005, she received the Kurt Lewin Award from the Society for the Psychological Study of Social Issues.

== Personal life ==
Faye Crosby was born to her mother, Andree Newman, a Jewish woman who had been born and raised in France, and her father, Bob Newman, a man from Kansas. She was raised on the East Coast of the United States and graduated high school in Long Island, New York before attending Wheaton College (Massachusetts) She graduated Magna Cum Laude with a Bachelor's in European history, and in 1972 she began working on her doctorate in social psychology at Boston University.

In 1973, in her first year at Boston University Crosby had her first son, and soon after moved to London for her husband's sabbatical. While in London, she continued studying psychology at the London School of Economics. After her time in London, she continued her education at the University of Boston.

== Professional career ==
=== Teaching ===
Faye Crosby is currently a professor of Psychology in the Social Sciences Division of University of California, Santa Cruz(UCSC). She previously served as Cowell College Provost of UCSC from 2010-2016^2. Crosby currently teaches Psyc 100: Research Methods as well as Cowell 138A: The Place of Higher Education in a Democratic Society at UCSC.

=== Awards ===
Crosby is a distinguished award winning expert in the field of Social Psychology. In 2016 Crosby received the Lifetime Achievement Award from the International Society of Justice Research, which recognizes scientific contributions to the field of social justice. Crosby also won the APA Division 35 Carolyn Wood Sherif award in 1996 which recognizes female leaders and teachers who have positively impacted the field of psychology. In 2005 Crosby received the Society for the Psychological Study of Social Issues(SPSSI)Kurt Lewin Award which is awarded for “outstanding contributions to the development and integration of psychological research and social action”. She is also the recipient of the Sherrie Spendlove Prize of University of California Merced which recognizes incredible work and dedication in the field of social justice.

== Works and Publications ==
=== Books ===
- Crosby, Faye J. Juggling : The Unexpected Advantages of Balancing Career and Home for Women and Their Families. 1st Free Press paperback ed. New York: Free Press, 1993. Print.
- Crosby, Faye J. Relative Deprivation and Working Women. New York: Oxford University Press, 1982. Print.
- Crosby, Faye J. Affirmative Action Is Dead : Long Live Affirmative Action. New Haven: Yale University Press, 2004. Print.
- Crosby, Faye J., ed. Spouse, Parent, Worker : On Gender and Multiple Roles. New Haven: Yale University Press, 1987. Print.
- Conrique, Beverly & Crosby, Faye. (2018). Objectivity, Subjectivity, and the Imprecision of the Social Sciences. Current Anthropology.

=== Research Articles ===
- Crosby, Faye J. “Advice from One Veteran.” Social justice research 36.3 (2023): 277–285. Web.
- Blake-Beard, Stacy et al. “Matching by Race and Gender in Mentoring Relationships: Keeping Our Eyes on the Prize.” Journal of social issues 67.3 (2011): 622–643. Web.
- Crosby, Faye J. “Sex Discrimination, Personal Denial, and Collateral Damage.” Social justice research 30.1 (2017): 89–105. Web.
- Robnett, Rachael D et al. “The Form and Function of STEM Research Mentoring: A Mixed-Methods Analysis Focusing on Ethnically Diverse Undergraduates and Their Mentors.” Emerging adulthood (Thousand Oaks, CA) 7.3 (2019): 180–193. Web.
- Crosby, Faye J, Joan C Williams, and Monica Biernat. “The Maternal Wall.” Journal of social issues 60.4 (2004): 675–682. Web.
- Crosby, Faye J, and Susan Clayton. “Affirmative Action: Psychological Contributions to Policy.” Analyses of social issues and public policy 1.1 (2001): 71–87. Web.
- Choma, Becky et al. “Perceptions of Personal Sex Discrimination: The Role of Belief in a Just World and Situational Ambiguity.” The Journal of social psychology 152.5 (2012): 568–585. Web.
- Crosby, Faye J et al. “Values and Science.” The American psychologist 59.2 (2004): 125–126. Web.
- Elizondo, Evellyn, and Faye Crosby. “Attitudes Toward Affirmative Action as a Function of the Strength of Ethnic Identity Among Latino College Students.” Journal of applied social psychology 34.9 (2004): 1773–1796. Web.
- Crosby, Faye J. “Understanding Affirmative Action.” Basic and applied social psychology 15.1–2 (1994): 13–41. Web.
- Crosby, Faye J et al. “Guest Editorial.” Equality, Diversity and Inclusion: An International Journal 40.4 (2021): 373–374. Web.
- CROSBY, FAYE. “The Denial of Personal Discrimination.” The American behavioral scientist (Beverly Hills) 27.3 (1984): 371–386. Web.
- Stockdale, Margaret S et al. “From Me Too to What Now: Advancing Scholarship on Sex Harassment Issue 1: A Persistent Problem.” Equality, Diversity and Inclusion 39.1 (2020): 1–4. Web.
- Crosby, Faye J, and Jamie L Franco. “Connections Between the Ivory Tower and the Multicolored World: Linking Abstract Theories of Social Justice to the Rough and Tumble of Affirmative Action.” Personality and social psychology review 7.4 (2003): 362–373. Web.
- Crosby, Faye J, and Lynn M Reinardy. “Closeness between Female College Students and Their Professors: A Novel Assessment Technique.” Sex roles 28.7–8 (1993): 477–483. Web.
- Conrique, Beverly & Crosby, Faye. (2024). Relative Deprivation and Cognate Theories: Making Sense of Irrational Behaviors. 10.1002/9781394266616.ch8.
- Tate, Charlotte & Ben Hagai, Ella & Crosby, Faye. (2020). Undoing the Gender Binary. 10.1017/9781108584234.
- Ben Hagai, Ella & Crosby, Faye. (2015). Reflections on Harmdoing. Peace and Conflict. 21. 10.1037/pac0000113.
- Sabattini, Laura & Crosby, Faye. (2015). Work-Life Policies, Programs, and Practices: Helping Women, Men, and Workplaces. 10.1007/978-94-017-9897-6_24.
- Crosby, F.J. & Sabattini, Laura & Aizawa, M.. (2013). Affirmative action and gender equality. 10.4135/9781446269930.n29.
- Crosby, Faye & Herek, Gregory. (2010). Male Sympathy with the Situation of Women: Does Personal Experience Make a Difference?. Journal of Social Issues. 42. 55 - 66. 10.1111/j.1540-4560.1986.tb00224.x.
- Clayton, Susan & Crosby, Faye. (2010). Postscript: The Nature of Connections. Journal of Social Issues. 42. 189 - 194. 10.1111/j.1540-4560.1986.tb00232.x.
- Crosby, Faye & Lubin, Elisabeth. (2010). Extending the Moral Community: Logical and Psychological Dilemmas. Journal of Social Issues. 46. 163 - 172. 10.1111/j.1540-4560.1990.tb00279.x.
- Crosby, Faye & Dovidio, John. (2008). Discrimination in America and Legal Strategies for Reducing it. 10.1002/9780470696422.ch2.
- Crosby, Faye & Ferdman, Bernardo & Wingate, Blanche. (2008). Addressing and Redressing Discrimination: Affirmative Action in Social Psychological Perspective. 10.1002/9780470693421.ch24.
- Smith, Amy & Crosby, Faye. (2008). From Kansas to Michigan: The path from desegregation to diversity.. 10.1037/11681-006.
- Tropp, Linda & Smith, Amy & Crosby, Faye. (2007). The Use of Research in the Seattle and Jefferson County Desegregation Cases: Connecting Social Science and the Law. Analyses of Social Issues and Public Policy. 7. 93 - 120. 10.1111/j.1530-2415.2007.00149.x.
- Crosby, Faye & Smith, Amy. (2007). The University of Michigan Cases: Social Scientific Studies of Diversity and Fairness. 10.1007/978-0-387-46218-9_6.
- Crosby, Faye & Bearman, Steve. (2006). The Uses of a Good Theory. Journal of Social Issues. 62. 415 - 438. 10.1111/j.1540-4560.2006.00458.x.
- Crosby, Faye & Bearman, Steve. (2006). The Uses of a Good Theory. Journal of Social Issues. 62. 415 - 438. 10.1111/j.1540-4560.2006.00458.x.
- Klonis, Suzanne & Endo, Joanne & Crosby, Faye & Worell, Judith. (1997). Feminism as Life Raft. Psychology of Women Quarterly. 21. 333 - 345. 10.1111/j.1471-6402.1997.tb00117.x.
- Crosby, Faye & Todd, Janet & Worell, Judith. (1996). Have Feminists Abandoned Social Activism? Voices from the Academy. 10.1007/978-1-4757-9927-9_6.
- Tougas, Francine & Crosby, Faye & Joly, Stéphane & Pelchat, Douglas. (1995). Men's attitudes toward affirmative action: Justice and intergroup relations at the crossroads. Social Justice Research. 8. 57-71. 10.1007/BF02334826.
