= Crutchfield situation =

Experimental procedure and apparatus to study conformity

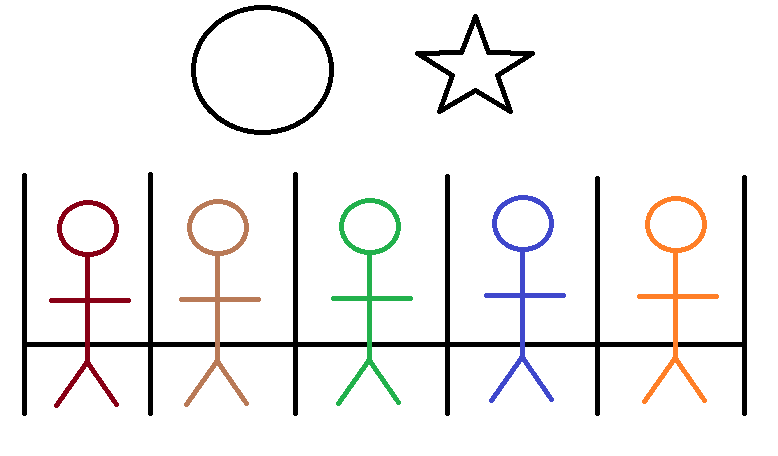
Figure 1. Participants are seated in side-by-side cubicles, partitioned by walls such that each participant can only look forward to see the projected slides, and are unable to see the other participants.

The Crutchfield Situation was an experimental procedure and apparatus created by Richard S. Crutchfield in 1955 to study conformity. Essentially, the Crutchfield Situation was an attempt to improve upon the methodology employed in the Asch conformity experiments. One of the major criticisms concerning the Asch studies was the need for many accomplices (i.e., confederates) in order to study one participant. According to Forsyth, an additional criticism of Asch's design was that “participants in the Asch studies stated their choices aloud under the watchful eyes of all the other members, and this procedure likely increased their feelings of embarrassment and of being evaluated.”

Crutchfield's design eliminated the need for many confederates, and protected against the potential of subjects’ feeling embarrassed by stating answers aloud, by placing participants into individual side-by-side cubicles. The partition walls in each cubicle blocked participants from seeing each other (see Figure 1).

== Procedure ==
After being sat into their individual cubicles, participants would make judgment decisions about various stimuli that were projected onto the wall in front of them. For example, one slide showed various shapes (e.g., a star and a circle), and the participants were asked to judge which shape had the greater area. The major difference between the Crutchfield Situation and Asch Situation was in how participants gave their responses. Instead of stating their answers aloud, each participant stated their response by flipping an appropriate switch on an electric control panel installed inside each cubicle. Prior to beginning the study, the experimenter explained that all of the response panels were interconnected such that the response of each participant would be displayed on all other corresponding panels. In other words, the response by the participant in cubicle A would be displayed on the other panels in cubicles B, C, D, and E (and vice versa; e.g., B's response was displayed on A, C, D, and E, etc.). As explained by Crutchfield in his own words, each participant's response “information would appear on the other panels in the form of signal lights, among five rows of eleven lights, each row corresponding to one of the five panels."

== Deception within the study ==
In truth, the participants were being deceived, and the experimenter was controlling the display lights on each participant's electric response panel from the experimenter's main control panel outside the participants’ view. In other words, when a participant saw his panel light up with the apparent responses from the other four subjects, the display lights were actually being purposely controlled by the experimenter.

During the procedure, Crutchfield led each participant to believe that he would give his judgement responses last. Since the experimenter actually controlled the signal lights on each participant's display panel, Crutchfield could purposely make it appear as though all other participants gave the same incorrect answer. Doing this allowed the experimental situation to be similar to Asch's design (i.e., the participant gives their response after seeing that all other participants have given the wrong answer). Crutchfield actually did this aforementioned procedure with all of the participants’ at the same time (albeit, this detail was unknown to all participants). Thus, through the Crutchfield Situation, the conformity behaviour of multiple participants could be studied simultaneously, whereas the Asch studies were able to study only one participant per session (and only with the aid of many other confederates).

== Results ==
All participants were influenced to conform at least once, with an average conformity rate of 38%. This is slightly lower than the conformity rate observed in the Asch situation. Some commentators posit that this observation was due largely to the fact that participants’ responses were private (i.e., no one knew which participant gave which response).
