= Donald T. Campbell Award =

Annual psychology award

- Sponsored by: Society for Personality and Social Psychology (SPSP)
- Location: Presented at the SPSP Annual Convention
- Presented by: Society for Personality and Social Psychology
- Established: 1980
- First award: 1980
- Website: spsp.org/awards/annual-awards/donald-t-campbell-award

The Donald T. Campbell Award is an annual award presented by the Society for Personality and Social Psychology, division 8 of the American Psychological Association, since 1980. It recognizes distinguished researchers in the field of social psychology and is named after social scientist and social psychologist Donald T. Campbell.

== Recipients ==
Source: SPSP

- 1980: Elliot Aronson
- 1982: Richard Nisbett
- 1984: Ellen Berscheid
- 1986: Bibb Latane
- 1988: Robert Rosenthal
- 1990: Bernard Weiner
- 1992: Marilynn Brewer
- 1993: Alice Eagly
- 1994: Anthony Greenwald
- 1995: Shelley Taylor
- 1996: E. Tory Higgins
- 1997: Mark Zanna
- 1998: Arie Kruglanski
- 1999: Abraham Tesser
- 2000: Richard E. Petty, John Cacioppo
- 2001: Claude Steele
- 2002: Hazel Markus
- 2003: Robert Cialdini
- 2004: Mark Snyder
- 2005: David Kenny
- 2006: John A. Bargh
- 2007: Michael Scheier, Charles S. Carver
- 2008: Carol Dweck
- 2009: Susan T. Fiske
- 2010: Russ Fazio
- 2011: John Dovidio
- 2012: Daniel Wegner
- 2013: Timothy Wilson
- 2014: Norbert Schwarz
- 2015: Brenda Major and Jennifer Crocker
- 2016: Mahzarin R. Banaji
- 2017: Daniel Gilbert
- 2018: Eliot R. Smith
- 2019: Thomas Gilovich
- 2020: Dale Miller

== See also ==
- List of psychology awards
