= Irene Hanson Frieze =

American psychologist and academic

- Education: University of California, Los Angeles
- Occupations: Professor Emeritus, University of Pittsburgh

Irene Hanson Frieze is a personality psychologist and pioneering figure in the field of women's studies. She is known for her research on intimate partner violence in marriage and dating relationships, and for cross-cultural studies of attitudes about work and gender roles. Frieze is Professor Emerita of Psychology and Women's Studies at the University of Pittsburgh.

In 2009, the Unger-Frieze Prize was established by the Association for Women in Psychology to honor the legacy of Rhoda Unger and Irene Hanson Frieze "for their early leadership in feminist research." This prize is awarded at the annual meeting of the Association for Women in Psychology to the best student-authored poster reporting research relevant to the field of feminist psychology.

== Awards ==
Frieze received many prestigious awards throughout her career. In 1989 she received the Carolyn Wood Sherif Lectureship Award from American Psychological Association (APA) Division 35 (Society for the Psychology of Women) on Considering the Social Context in Gender Research, which was subsequently published in Psychology of Women Quarterly. She received the 1998 Distinguished Publication Award from the Association for Women in Psychology for her work as co-editor of the 1997 Special Issue Measuring Beliefs about Appropriate Roles for Women and Men published in the Psychology of Women Quarterly.

In 2000, Frieze received the Distinguished Leadership Award from the APA Committee on Women in Psychology "in recognition of over thirty years of research, teaching, scholarly writing, and social activism utilizing psychology to advance women’s lives." Other notable awards included the 2003 Distinguished Service Award from the Society for the Psychological Study of Social Issues, the 2005 Florence L. Denmark and Mary E. Reuder Award for Outstanding International Contributions to the Psychology of Women and Gender from APA Division 52 (International Committee for Women), the 2014 Florence Denmark Distinguished Mentoring Award from the Association for Women in Psychology, and the 2014 Iris Marion Young Award for Political Engagement.

== Biography ==
Frieze received her Bachelor of Arts degree in Psychology and Mathematics from the University of California, Los Angeles (UCLA) in 1967. She continued her education at UCLA, obtaining her master's degree in 1968, and her Doctorate degree in Personality Psychology in 1973. Frieze joined faculty of the University of Pittsburgh in 1972 with a dual position in the department of Psychology and Women's Studies. She retired in 2016.

Frieze served terms as President of the Society for the Psychology of Women (APA Division 35), Society for Psychological Study of Social Issues (APA Division 9), and the Society for General Psychology (APA Division 1). She served as the Chair of the International Committee for Women (APA Division 52), and as Editor of Sex Roles, and the Journal of Social Issues.

== Research ==
Irene Hanson Frieze is known for her feminist voice in psychology as an early advocate for scholarship on the women's studies. Her co-authored textbook Women and Sex Roles: A Social Psychological Perspective, published in 1978, underscored the importance of including the study of women in the undergraduate psychology curriculum.

Frieze conducted ground-breaking research on dating routines, violence and love in close relationships, and reactions to victimization. Her paper Investigating the Causes and Consequences of Marital Rape aimed to clear misconceptions about marital rape by establishing that it is possible for married couples who are having consensual sex to also experience marital rape between husband and wife. Her book Hurting the One You Love offered a synthesis of an extensive program of research on intimate partner violence and its impact on others close to the victim. The theme of violence against women was further explored in the volume Stalking: Perspectives on Victims and Perpetrators, which Frieze co-edited with Keith E. Davis and Roland D. Maiuro.

One of Frieze's main interests concerned gender differences in the workforce and in attitudes about work and gender roles. In Assessing the Theoretical Models for Sex Differences in Causal Attributions for Success and Failure, Frieze and her colleagues determined through meta-analysis that men were less likely than women to attribute their successes or failures to luck. In another co-authored paper, Attractiveness and Income for Men and Women in Management, Frieze and her colleagues examined the effect of attractiveness on employment outcomes of men and women. The authors reported that men who were rated as more attractive were more likely to get hired, have higher starting salaries, and receive raises. The results were less clear for women: there was no effect of attractiveness for starting salaries, but attractive women were likely to have higher earnings later on in their careers.
