= Richard Crutchfield =

Richard S. Crutchfield
- Born: June 20, 1912; Pittsburgh, Pennsylvania
- Died: July 19, 1977 (aged 65); Berkeley, California
- Education: University of California, Berkeley
- Scientific career
- Fields: Psychology
- Workplaces: University of California, Berkeley
- Thesis: The induction of behavior potential in the rat (1938)

Richard Stanley Crutchfield (June 20, 1912 – July 19, 1977) was an American experimental, personality and social psychologist who, in the 1930s, was instrumental in moving psychology from a tradition of single-factor experiments to an experimental design based on analysis of variance and covariance.

Crutchfield co-authored two influential texts with David Krech. The first is the very successful social psychology textbook Theory and Problems of Social Psychology (1948). The second was an introductory psychology text, first published in 1958, Elements of Psychology, which has been widely used and has numerous editions and derivatives.

In the 1950s, Crutchfield's work helped to establish the linkage between cognitive-perceptual processes and significant facets of personality. His best-known research was a series of investigations of the nature of conformity in interpersonal sphere of social psychology, which were published during the height of what is known in psychological circles as the 'conformity era' in the United States. In the late 1950s and 1960s, Crutchfield collaborated with several colleagues to develop a programme of automated instruction in productive thinking.

Crutchfield was known as an excellent teacher. He was a student of Edward Tolman.

== See also ==
- Crutchfield situation
