= Analyses of Social Issues and Public Policy =

- Discipline: Social psychology
- Language: English
- Edited by: Chris Aberson

Publication details
- History: 2001-present
- Publisher: Wiley-Blackwell on behalf of the Society for the Psychological Study of Social Issues
- Frequency: Annually

Standard abbreviations
- ISO 4: Anal. Soc. Issues Public Policy

Indexing
- ISSN: 1529-7489 (print); 1530-2415 (web)
- LCCN: 00214742
- OCLC no.: 807130080

Links
- Journal homepage; Online access; Online archive

Analyses of Social Issues and Public Policy is an annual peer-reviewed academic journal published by Wiley-Blackwell on behalf of the Society for the Psychological Study of Social Issues along with the Journal of Social Issues and Social Issues and Policy Review. The journal was established in 2001. The current editor-in-chief is Chris Aberson (Humboldt State University). The journal covers social psychological methods in the study of economic and social justice including ageism, heterosexism, racism, sexism, status quo bias, and other forms of discrimination, social problems such as climate change, extremism, homelessness, inter-group conflict, natural disasters, poverty, and terrorism, and social ideals such as democracy, empowerment, equality, health, and trust. Subscribers also receive a full subscription to the Journal of Social Issues and Social Issues and Policy Review.

== Abstracting and indexing ==
The journal is abstracted and indexed in:

- Academic Search
- Criminal Justice Abstracts
- CSA Biological Sciences Database
- CSA Environmental Sciences & Pollution Management Database
- Current Contents/Social & Behavioral Sciences
- Ecology Abstracts
- PsycINFO/Psychological Abstracts
- Social Sciences Citation Index
- Social Services Abstracts
- Sociological Abstracts
- Worldwide Political Sciences Abstracts
