= Lawrence Wrightsman =

American psychologist

- Born: Lawrence Samuel Wrightsman, Jr. October 31, 1931; Houston, Texas
- Died: July 28, 2019 (aged 87)
- Education: Southern Methodist University; University of Minnesota
- Scientific career
- Fields: Social psychology
- Institutions: George Peabody College for Teachers; University of Kansas
- Thesis: The effects of small-group membership on level of concern (1959)
- Doctoral advisor: Stanley Schachter

Lawrence Samuel Wrightsman, Jr. (October 31, 1931 – July 28, 2019) was an American psychologist known for his research in social psychology and the psychology of law. He taught at the University of Kansas from 1976 until his retirement in 2008. He served as president of the Society for the Psychological Study of Social Issues (SPSSI) from 1976 to 1977 and the Society for Personality and Social Psychology (SPSP) from 1977 to 1978. According to the SPSP, "The textbooks, articles, and addresses that Larry wrote helped create the field of psychology and law as we know it."
