= Richard Schanck =

American social psychologist

- Born: May 7, 1902; Libertyville, Illinois, USA
- Died: January 23, 1964 (aged 61); New Castle, Pennsylvania, USA
- Spouse: Marion Fisher (m. 1926)
- Children: 4

Academic background
- Education: Northwestern University; Syracuse University; University of London
- Thesis: A Study of a Community and its Groups and Institutions Conceived of as Behaviors of Individuals (1932)

Academic work
- Discipline: Sociologist
- Sub-discipline: Social psychology researcher

Richard Louis Schanck (May 7, 1902 – January 23, 1964) was an American social psychologist. He co-authored the first textbook on sociology. At the end of his career, he was department head at Bethany College and at Geneva College. In the 1940s, he led the ACLU Akron branch, to unionize auto and steel workers. Throughout his career, Schanck worked and consulted with city planners, and he was one of the organizers of the Institute of Experimental Method, devoted to the ideas of Edgar Singer. He taught at many colleges across the country as a guest lecturer or visiting professor.

== Biography ==
Schanck was born in 1902 in Libertyville, Illinois to Lewis Henry Schanck and Eleanor Amelia Galloway Schanck. He was the one boy in a family of eight children. His father, Lewis, inherited the family hardware store from his father, whose family settled in Illinois in 1836. His father had the first automobile in town. His maternal grandfather was the town physician. The Schanck family was known to be proud of their Daughters of the American Revolution and Dutch and English heritage, but their son was more interested in ideas and academics. He loved to travel and was always interested in local history. In his book, The Permanent Revolution in Science, he describes how thinking about problems changes with the evolution of science, involving the period between Aristotle and Edgar Singer.

Schanck began college at Beloit College, but he earned both his B.A. in 1924 in English, and his M.A. in 1926 in psychology, at Northwestern University. In 1932, Schanck got his Ph.D. from the Syracuse University. His thesis was "A Study of a Community and its Groups and Institutions Conceived of as Behaviors of Individuals." Both Daniel Katz and Schanck were students at the newly organized Maxwell School of Citizenship and Public Affairs at Syracuse University where Floyd Allport was the chairman and together Katz and Schanck authored the first text book for sociology.

After finishing his Ph.D. at Syracuse University under Floyd H. Allport, Schanck moved his family to Oxford England (1933–1934) to continue his study of rural communities. He returned to England in the summer of 1937 to do advanced studies at the University of London. In 1938–39 at Louisiana State University, Schanck befriended Dr. Thomas A. Cowan, Professor of law (later at Rutgers University and the University of Pennsylvania), and they remained friends until Schanck's death. Another notable friend at Louisiana State University was Duncan Ferguson, art and sculpture teacher at Louisiana State University. Ferguson credited Schanck for turning him into a Trotskyite.

Fergusons and Schancks moved back to Gambier, Ohio and Schanck became the head of the A.C.L.U. in Akron, and worked with others to organize auto and steel workers. Ferguson and his wife, Demila went on to work in New York City in 1941. In the 1940s the ACLU was caught up in the "Red Scare," and Schanck's helping organize steel and auto workers was considered by some as a communist activity. Along with seven others, he was indicted for absconding with a compromised ballot box and spent that year at the Ohio State Penitentiary, where he was able to work on a book. In 1946–1952 the Schancks resided in Solon, OH and he became good friends with Drs Russell Ackoff and C. West Churchman. They often came to Solon, sometimes along with Sheila Spaulding of Philadelphia's City Planning Dept. to discuss philosophy and plan the Institute for Experimental Method. In 1958. when at the Institute of Urban Studies at the School of Planning, University of Pennsylvania he mentored R.G. "Bob" Dyck in his dissertation. In 1960–1963 Schanck was instrumental in helping to organize the Center for Appalachian Studies and Development at West Virginia University. He worked with President Paul Miller and leading politicians in the West Virginia legislature. He recruited Dick Slavin, Bethany's head of Economics, as well as Bob Dyck and Milt Patton, both graduates of Penn's Planning Program, to staff the Office of Research and Development as the planning and development arm of the Appalachian Center.

== Teaching career ==
- Syracuse University, Lecturer, 1928–1932;
- Harvard University, Instructor in Psychology, and Tutor in Division of Philosophy and Psychology, 1936–1937;
- Kenyon College, Gambier OH, Associate Professor of Psychology, 1937–1938;
- Louisiana State University, Baton Rouge, LA, Professor and Director of the Psychological Laboratory, 1939–1940;
- Ohio Wesleyan University, Visiting professor, 1942;
- Western Reserve University, Lecturer of Personnel Management, War Training Program, 1943;
- Case Institute of Technology, Lecturer, 1946–1952;
- State University of New York at Plattsburgh, 1951;
- Carnegie Institute of Technology, Lecturer, 1952–57;
- Bethany College, Chairman 1952–1962;
- Duquesne University, Pittsburgh PA, Lecturer in Management, 1955–56;
- Fine Arts Division of the Institute of Urban Studies at the School of Planning, Special Lecturer, 1956–1957;
- New Mexico Highlands University, Sociology Department, New Mexico, Visiting professor, 1961;
- Geneva College, Beaver Falls, PA, Sociology Depart, Part-time, 1960, Chairman of Sociology Department, 1962–1963.

== Consulting ==
Schanck consulted with the City Planning to the Planning Commissions of Philadelphia, Cleveland and Detroit, with the West Virginia Democratic State Executive Committee and the National Outdoor Resources Review Committee and the State Senate. He was also an honorary member of the Board of Wheeling Steel.

In May 1946, Schanck helped organize for the Institute of Experimental Method the "Conference on Measurement of Consumer Interest" with several of Edgar A. Singer's students at the University of Pennsylvania. A wide group of experts participated, including Wroe Anderson, a marketing expert, and W. Edwards Deming, a sampling expert. Both became interested in the objectives of the Institute of Experimental Method and continued afterward to make contributions to it. Also in summer of 1946 Schanck helped organize conferences for the Institute of Experimental Method, which were held at Oberlin, Ohio and Columbus, Ohio. At the Oberlin meeting, Aaron Horowitz of the Cleveland Planning Commission raised the question of how the Institute could be of help to planners and architects, and was provided a response by Russ Ackoff. The Columbus meeting dealt with questions of quality control in industry. Subsequently, a meeting on social work was arranged at a settlement house in NYC. Participants included Frank Weise, architect, Sheila Spaulding, planner, Edwards Deming marketing expert, and Charles M. Goodman, psychologist and the Federation of Settlement Houses.

Next, a series of meetings was held on city planning with members of the Philadelphia, Cleveland, and Detroit Planning Commissions. Sheila Spaulding was the principal organizer. Robert Mitchell, Director of the Philadelphia Planning Commission, and Steven Kaufman of the Cleveland Regional Planning group, were involved along with Aaron Horowitz. Wayne State University then sponsored a conference on City Planning that involved these organizations.

== Personal life ==
Richard L. Schanck married Marion Helen Fisher in 1926 and they had three children, Jean Van Schanck (1928), Victoria Joanna Van Schanck (1937) and Peter Ruloff Van Schanck (1938). Schanck had a son John Schanck (1944) by Dr. Alma Eberley in 1944. On January 23, 1964, Richard Schanck died from cancer in New Castle, Pennsylvania.

== Publications ==
- 1932, "Psychology in Relation to Social and Political Problems", with Floyd H. Allport and Milton C. Dickens, in Paul S. Achilles, Ed., Psychology at Work, New York, McGraw Hill.
- 1932, "A Study of a community and its groups and institutions conceived of as behaviors of individuals", Vol. 43, Issue 2, Psychological Review Company.
- 1938, Social Psychology, by Daniel Katz and Richard L. Schanck, New York, John Wiley.
- 1954, The Permanent Revolution in Science, Philosophical Library, New York,
- 2011, The Permanent Revolution in Science. Richard L. Schanck and C. West Churchman, (Reissue of 1954 book). New York, Philosophical Library.
