= Brenda Major =

American psychologist

- Born: August 21, 1950 (age 76)
- Education: Purdue University
- Awards: Society for Personality and Social Psychology's Donald T. Campbell Award (2015), Society of Experimental Social Psychology's Scientific Impact Prize (2014)
- Scientific career
- Fields: Social psychology
- Workplaces: University of California, Santa Barbara
- Thesis: Information acquisition and attribution processes (1978)

Brenda Nelle Major (born August 21, 1950) is an American social psychologist and distinguished professor in the Department of Psychological and Brain Sciences at the University of California, Santa Barbara, where she heads the Self and Social Identity Lab.

== Education and career ==
Major received her B.A. from the College of Wooster in 1972, her M.A. from Miami University in 1975 and her Ph.D. in social psychology from Purdue University in 1978. Also in 1978, she joined the faculty of the State University of New York at Buffalo, where she taught in the psychology department from then until 1995. From 1992 to 1995, she headed the State University of New York at Buffalo's social psychology program. In 1995, she joined the University of California, Santa Barbara's faculty, where she became a distinguished professor in 2009. She is a former fellow of Stanford University's Center for Advanced Study in the Behavioral Sciences.

== Research ==
Major is known for her research into social stigma and psychological resilience. Specific subjects she has researched include the relationship between abortion and mental health. For example, she chaired a 2008 American Psychological Association task force on the subject, which found major flaws in many of the relevant studies available at the time. The same panel found that the best available evidence indicated that a single abortion did not increase the risk of mental health problems relative to giving birth. She has also studied differences in self-perception of one's abilities and performance between men and women. In 2016, she published a study showing that white Americans who identify strongly as white become more likely to support Donald Trump in the 2016 U.S. presidential election if they are reminded that America's demographics are changing. Specifically, the participants in the study were reminded that whites are projected to become a minority in the United States by 2042.

== Honors, awards and positions ==
Major is the past president of the Society of Experimental Social Psychology (SESP) and the Society for Personality and Social Psychology (SPSP). Her awards include the SESP's Scientific Impact Prize for 2014, the SPSP's Donald T. Campbell Award for 2015, and the Kurt Lewin Prize from the Society for the Psychological Study of Social Issues for 2012. She was American Academy of Arts and Sciences Fellow of 2019. In 2024 Major was elected to the National Academy of Sciences.
