= David Krech =

- Isadore Krechevsky
- Born: Yitzhok-Eizik Krechevsky; March 27, 1909; Švenčionys, Russian Empire (now Lithuania)
- Died: July 14, 1977 (aged 68)
- Education: Washington Square College of New York University, University of California, Berkeley
- Spouse: Hilda Sidonie Gruenberg
- Scientific career
- Fields: Social and Experimental Psychology

David Krech (March 27, 1909 – July 14, 1977) was an American experimental and social psychologist who lectured predominantly at the University of California, Berkeley. Throughout his education and career endeavors, Krech was with many psychologists including Edward Tolman, Karl Lashley, and Rensis Likert.

Krech was born as Yitzhok-Eizik Krechevsky, but changed his name to Isadore Krechevsky upon emigration to the United States in 1913. His name was changed to David Krech in 1943 when he married Hilda Sidonie Gruenberg. Krech did this because he did not want his future son(s) to be labeled with a Jewish name that had held him back in both academic and career pursuits.

Krech extensively researched rats in several university laboratories and found evidence that supported the localization theory of the brain. Later in his career, Krech became interested in the topic of Social Psychology which led him to publishing Theory and Problems of Social Psychology in 1948 with Richard S. Crutchfield (revised into Individual in Society, 1962). Krech also lectured at many universities on the topic of Social Psychology, Experimental Psychology, and others. Because of his involvement in Social Psychology, Krech was appointed by Thurgood Marshall to give expert testimony in the Briggs vs. Elliot court case regarding the "Separate but equal" law. This was the first federal court case that allowed a social psychologist to provide expert testimony. Toward the end of his research career, Krech collaborated with Melvin Calvin, Mark R. Rosenzweig, Edward L. Bennett, and Marian Diamond to research the relationship between brain chemistry and behavior in rats as well as the anatomical neuroplasticy in the rat cortex.

== Personal life ==
David Krech was born as Yitzhok-Eizik Krechevsky on March 27, 1909, in Švenčionys (now in modern Lithuania, then in the Russian Empire), to Joseph Krechevsky and Sarah Rabinowitz. He was the second youngest of nine children, one of whom died before adulthood. In May 1913, when Krech was 4-years-old, his Jewish family emigrated to New Britain, Connecticut from Lithuania. There, he attended elementary and secondary school, where he was a very good student and soon became the self-proclaimed "best educated American" in his family. As a child, Krech enjoyed writing short stories, and he studied in a Hebrew school, learning Hebrew and how to read in Yiddish. He had a passion for the Hebrew language and literature that stayed with him throughout his life, even after he rejected formal religion. On September 17, 1943, Krech married Hilda Sidonie Gruenberg in Washington D.C. With Hilda, Krech had one child, Richard, who would raise Krech's three grandchildren. David Krech died at his home in Berkeley, California, on July 14, 1977, at the age of 67.

== Education ==
After elementary and secondary schooling, Krech enrolled at Washington Square College of New York University to pursue a degree in pre-law with hopes of becoming a Supreme Court Justice. In his second year at NYU, he found law was not for him, and he became interested in Psychology after taking an introductory psychology class from William Darby Glenn. As a psychology major, Krech enrolled in T. C. Schneirla's course where he was first introduced Comparative psychology and animal research. As an undergrad, Krech was guided by Frances Holden in his first experiments with laboratory rats completing discriminatory problems. Krech obtained his undergraduate degree in psychology from NYU in 1930, and finished his master's degree in 1931, also from NYU. To gain his PhD, Krech enrolled at the University of California Berkeley where he continued to study rats with Robert Tryon and was influenced by Edward C. Tolman. Krech obtained his PhD from Berkeley in 1933.

== Career ==
After graduating with his PhD, Krech accepted a National Research Council Fellowship with Karl Lashley in Chicago studying brain lesions in rats. When Lashley left Chicago for Harvard, Krech was promoted to supervise the laboratory. While in Chicago, Krech became politically active as he took part in a strike on Memorial Day in 1937 that later became known as the Memorial Day Massacre of 1937. He and other witnesses expressed complete disapproval and this event led to Krech leaving the University of Chicago. Also in Chicago, Krech worked for an organization called New America from September 1939 to July 1941. New America was an organization created to better the United States society during the Great Depression. For New America, Krech was a managing editor of publications. New America shut down in 1941 due to lack of progress as a result of American's focus on Hitler. Krech was also interested in connecting psychologists and encouraged them to better America. To do this, he, along with two other New Americans, Ward Halstead and Lorenz Meyer, put together a front-page advertisement announcing an idea for a new group. They received numerous replies to the advertisement and then formed the National Organizing Committee which attended the 1936 APA meetings. There, the group was changed to the Society for the Psychological Study of Social Issues (SPSSI). The aim of SPSSI was to encourage research of controversial topics in psychology.

After four years in Chicago, Krech accepted an offer from Robert MacLeod for a research associateship position at Swarthmore. There, he started an animal research laboratory and conducted research. In 1938, Krech was appointed to teaching faculty at the University of Colorado Boulder, but shortly after on June 10, 1939, Krech was fired from the university and expelled from academia due to a clash of opinions on political matters between him and the board of regents. After his removal from the University of Colorado Boulder, Krech worked in Rensis Likert's Division of Program Surveys where he learned about attitude research. Krech also entered the United States Army when he was assigned to the Office of Strategic Services (OSS). While in this position, he conducted social psychology experiments regarding spies that the United States Army utilized during World War II.

After a while out of academia, Krech was offered an assistant professorship position at Swarthmore by Macleod. During this position is when he began publishing under the name David Krech. In 1947, Krech was hired as an associate professor at the University of California, Berkeley. There he taught primarily in social psychology and began many collaborations with Richard Crutchfield. Two years after teaching at Berkeley, Krech was invited to teach as a visiting professor of social psychology at the University of Oslo in Norway. After his year in Oslo, Krech taught at Harvard as a visiting lecturer on social psychology and was a research associate in a social relations laboratory. Krech taught at Harvard because he was avoiding signing the political loyalty oath required at Berkeley. However, in order to take a leave from Berkeley, he was required to sign it, yet he still refused. Therefore, Krech was dismissed from the university. After Krech's time at Harvard, he worked with Kenneth Clark and Thurgood Marshall in the South Carolina case Briggs v. Elliott that addressed the issue of Separate but Equal. Krech testified saying that segregation can greatly damage children psychologically. This was the first time a Supreme Court case had allowed a social psychologist to provide expert testimony. After the political loyalty oath requirement was removed, Krech returned to Berkeley where he focused mainly on experimental psychology. In 1972, Krech, age 62, retired from the University of California, Berkeley. In his time, Krech also was a visiting professor at the University of Njimegen, and Brandeis University.

== Research ==
As an undergraduate student, Krech began his research with the basics. He was a laboratory assistant for T. C. Schneirla, spending his time caring for the lab's rats and army ants. During this time, Frances Holden became Krech's patron. Krech developed his first Hypothesis Box to begin doing animal research on his own. He began to run rats through discrimination problems using his Hypothesis Box. Krech's ideas for research pertaining to his master's thesis came to him after he read Brain Mechanisms and Intelligence by Karl Lashley. He was particularly influenced by Lashley's finding that in some tasks, rats would try different solutions to problems before coming to the final, correct solution. For his thesis, he conducted an experiment with rats that demonstrated learning is not a hit or miss event, instead it is systematic. He concluded that learning is a trial-and-error series of actions, where responses that are incorrect are stopped and correct responses are "stamped in". Krech worked toward his doctoral dissertation at University of California, Berkeley alongside Edward C. Tolman. It repeated the same experiment as his master's thesis. For his dissertation, he added supplementary studies to analyze in more detail the inherent qualities and origin of hypotheses.

At the University of Chicago, Krech worked with Karl Lashley for three years. The two inquired into the exploration of the brain processes that underlie the behavior of hypotheses. Once Krech was at Swarthmore College, he began an animal laboratory where he published a single experiment with rats and worked with Karl Duncker to publish a theoretical article. His experiments focused on studying perception and new ways of inquiring and analyzing. While Krech was a sergeant in the United States Army he was focused on measuring attitudes and evaluating candidates for spy positions to go into enemy territory. After Krech returned to University of California, Berkeley, alongside Melvin Calvin, he began to study the analysis of chemical changes located in the brain that could possibly underlie learning. These interactions led to Krech studying brain chemistry and its relationship to behavior with Mark Rosenzweig and Edward Bennett. With the addition to the team of Marian Diamond, neuroanatomist, in 1960, Krech and associates were able to pursue the anatomical effects of deliberate enrichment and impoverishment on rat brains at any age. Diamond recalls that when she had replicated the anatomical experiment that proved that the cerebral cortex of the enriched rats was 6% thicker than the cortex of the impoverished rats, Krech had said "This is unique. This will change scientific thought about the brain." The team continued to publish together until 1972 when Krech retired from the University of California, Berkeley.

== Publications ==
=== Books ===
- Theory and Problems of Social Psychology (1948) was written when Krech returned to University of California, Berkeley while he was collaborating with Richard Crutchfield. This book gave social psychology more of an abstract basis in both the psychology of perception and Gestalt psychology.
- Elements of Psychology (1958)
- Individual in Society (1962)

=== Articles ===
For a complete list of article publications from 1932 to 1968 by Krech, see David Krech: Distinguished Scientific Contribution Awards.

== Awards ==
- Citation of Achievement from New York University
- Award from the International Forum of the Neurological Organization
- Certificate of Merit from the Mathematics and Science Center
- In 1970, Krech was awarded the APA Award for Distinguished Scientific Contributions to Psychology
- Honorary doctorate from University of Oslo
- Miller Research Professorship at Berkeley
- President of the Society for the Psychological Study of Social Issues
- Two Fulbright fellowships
