= Phyllis A. Katz =

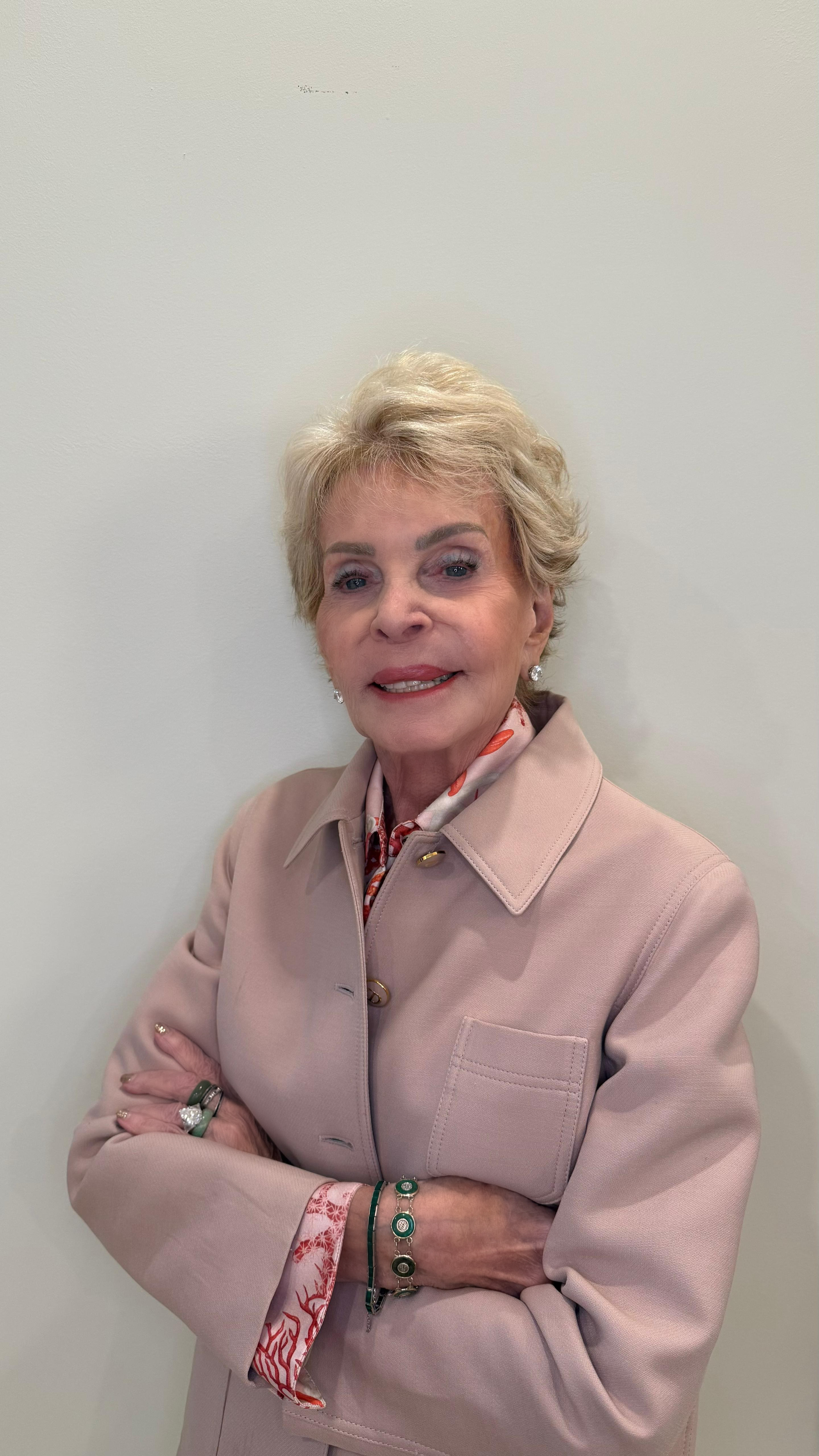
- Born: April 9, 1938 (age 88); Brooklyn, New York, U.S.
- Education: Syracuse University (BA); Yale University (PhD)
- Known for: Research on early development of race and gender attitudes in children
- Awards: Elizabeth Hurlock Beckman Award (2012); American Psychological Association Distinguished Contributions to Psychology in the Public Interest – Senior Career Achievement (2002); SPSSI Outstanding Service Award (1996); Carolyn Wood Sherif Award (1994)
- Scientific career
- Fields: Developmental psychology, Clinical psychology

Phyllis A. Katz (born April 9, 1938) is an American developmental and clinical psychologist known for her research on the early development of race and gender attitudes in children. She is the founding editor of Sex Roles: A Journal of Research and has held leadership positions within the American Psychological Association (APA) and multiple research institutions. In 2002, she received the American Psychological Association's Award for Distinguished Senior Career Contributions to the Public Interest. Her work has been widely cited in psychology, education, and public policy.

== Early life and education ==
On April 9, 1938, Phyllis A. Katz was born to Alice Weiner and Martin Alberts in Brooklyn, New York. She grew up in Brooklyn as an only child, and attended Abraham Lincoln High School.

Katz began attending Syracuse University in 1954, and graduated summa cum laude with a Bachelor of Arts in 1957. Katz earned her Ph.D. in developmental and clinical psychology from Yale University in 1961. At Yale, she studied under Edward Zigler, with Lawrence Kohlberg and William Kessen on her dissertation committee.

== Awards ==
Katz received the Committee on Women in Psychology's Senior Leadership Award in 1989. Additional awards include the Elizabeth Hurlock Beckman Award (2012) for excellence in teaching and mentoring,American Psychological Association (2002) Distinguished Contributions to Psychology in the Public Interest – Senior Career Achievement, Society for the Psychological Study of Social Issues (1996) Outstanding Service Award for major contributions to SPSSI's growth and effectiveness, and the American Psychological Association Division 35 (1994) Carolyn Wood Sherif Award.

== Selected publications ==
- Katz, P. A. (2020). "Incipient Racism? When Does it Start? Racial Attitude Development in Young Children." Advances in Social Sciences Research Journal, 7(9), 766–785.
- Katz, P.A. (2018). "The Ages of Women." Advances in Applied Sociology, 9, 1–11.
- Katz, P., Winiarski, A. (2013). "Sex Role Stereotypes and Gender Differences." Encyclopedia of Diversity in Education, 1948–1958.
- Katz, P.A., & Katz, M. (1997). The Feminist Dollar: The Wise Woman's Buying Guide. New York: Plenum Publishing.
- Katz, P.A. (1996). "Raising feminists." Sex Roles.
- Katz, P.A., & Ksansnak, K. R. (1993). "Developmental aspects of gender-role behavior in childhood and adolescence." Developmental Psychology, 30, 272–282.
- Katz, P. A., & Walsh, P. V. (1991). "Modification of children's gender-stereotyped behavior." Child Development, 62, 338–351.
- Katz, P. A. (1979). "The development of female identity." Sex Roles, 5, 155–178.
- Katz, P. A., & Zalk, S. R. (1978). "Modification of children's racial attitudes." Developmental Psychology, 14, 447–461.
- Zalk, S. R., & Katz, P. A. (1978). "Gender attitudes in children." Sex Roles, 4, 349–358.
