= Martin Deutsch (psychologist) =

American developmental psychologist

- Born: 1926; New York City, US
- Died: 2002 (aged 75–76); Norwalk Hospital, Norwalk, Connecticut, US
- Citizenship: American
- Education: Columbia University
- Known for: Compensatory education
- Spouse: Cynthia Deutsch
- Children: 1
- Scientific career
- Fields: Developmental psychology
- Institutions: New York University

Martin Deutsch (1926–2002) was an American developmental psychologist known for his research on the education of disadvantaged children. His efforts to develop a compensatory education program in New York City served as a predecessor to the national Head Start program. He developed early intervention programs with what he called a "therapeutic curriculum", which aimed to specifically address the deficient experiences of children living in deprived environments. He believed that such environments put children at a disadvantage with respect to beginning school and acquiring basic literacy skills.

== Biography ==
Born in New York City, Deutsch was educated at Columbia University (B.A., 1943; M.A., 1947; Ph.D., 1951). In 1958, he and his wife founded the Institute for Developmental Studies at New York University, where he became a professor in 1960. He remained director of the Institute for Developmental Studies for the rest of his career. He was the president of the Society for the Psychological Study of Social Issues in 1969. He died of renal failure on June 26, 2002, at Norwalk Hospital in Norwalk, Connecticut.

== Research ==
In 1962, Deutsch began a pilot early childhood education program in Harlem for disadvantaged 3- and 4-year-olds. In the program, Deutsch aimed to give children early exposures to experiences in which they had been lacking, such as music and books. In the short term, the program aimed to equip children with the skills they would need for formal education; in the long term, it was intended to improve participants' communication and learning skills, thereby benefiting them in adult life. A 1964 article in Life described the program as "the first scientific and concerted attempt by any public school system to confront the problem of educating poor preschool children.

== Criticism of hereditarianism ==
Deutsch was an early critic of Arthur Jensen's controversial essay How Much Can We Boost IQ and Scholastic Achievement?, published in the Harvard Educational Review in 1969. In a subsequent issue of the same journal, Deutsch criticized Jensen's essay for allegedly supporting racism, and claimed that the essay contained "many erroneous statements, misinterpretations, and misunderstandings". In 1973, he debated Richard Herrnstein over the relative importance of genetics and environment in determining human intelligence. The debate was held at the Carnegie Center in Manhattan and sponsored by the magazine Social Policy.
