= John Dovidio =

American psychologist

- Born: John Francis Dovidio
- Education: Dartmouth College; University of Delaware
- Known for: Aversive racism
- Awards: Donald T. Campbell Award from the Society for Personality and Social Psychology (2011)
- Scientific career
- Fields: Social psychology
- Institutions: Yale University
- Thesis: The subtlety of white racism: three studies investigating the dimensions of prejudice (1977)
- Doctoral students: Mark Hatzenbuehler

John Francis Dovidio is the Carl Iver Hovland Professor Emeritus of Psychology and Public Health at Yale University, where he is also the former director of the Intergroup Relations Lab. He is known for his research on the concept of aversive racism and on reducing people's intergroup biases. He was the president of the Society for the Psychological Study of Social Issues from 1999 to 2000. He served as the editor-in-chief of the Personality and Social Psychology Bulletin from 1994 to 1997, of the Journal of Personality and Social Psychology's Interpersonal Relations and Group Processes section from 2002 to 2008, and the co-editor of Social Issues and Policy Review from 2006 to 2011. In 2011, he received the Donald T. Campbell Award from the Society for Personality and Social Psychology, and in 2014, he received the Society's Award for Distinguished Service.
