= Rhoda Unger =

Feminist psychologist

- Born: February 22, 1939; Brooklyn, New York
- Died: April 19, 2019 (aged 80)
- Citizenship: United States
- Occupations: Professor of Psychology and Women's Studies
- Spouse: Burton M. Unger
- Awards: APF Gold Medal for Lifetime Achievement in Psychology in the Public Interest (2007); AWP Distinguished Publication and Career Achievement Award (1994)

Academic background
- Education: Brooklyn College; Harvard University

Academic work
- Institutions: Montclair State University; Brandeis University

Rhoda K. Unger (1939–2019) was a feminist psychologist known for her position at the forefront of female activism in psychology. Unger was strongly committed to promoting social justice within society and women in science. She was a professor of psychology at Montclair State College for almost thirty years and was granted the status of Professor Emerita in 1999. After her retirement, Unger was a resident scholar at the Women's Studies Research Center at Brandeis University.

Unger was a pioneering figure in the Association for Women in Psychology (AWP), the Society for the Psychology of Women (American Psychological Association, Division 35), and the Society for the Psychological Study of Social Issues (SPSSI). She served terms as President of the Society for the Psychology of Women (1980–1981) and President of the SPSSI (1998–1999), and was the inaugural editor of SPSSI's journal Analyses of Social Issues and Public Policy.

== Awards ==
Unger and her colleagues Virginia O'Leary and Barbara Wallston were awarded the AWP Distinguished Publication award in 1985 for their book Women, gender, and social psychology. The AWP awarded Unger the Distinguished Career award in 1994 and subsequently established the Unger-Frieze Prize in 2009 in recognition of the early leadership of Unger and Irene Frieze in feminist studies.

Unger was awarded the gold medal for Lifetime Achievement in Psychology in the Public Interest from the American Psychological Foundation in 2007.

== Biography ==
Rhoda Kesler Unger was born in Brooklyn, NY on February 22, 1939 into a working-class Jewish family. She received a Bachelor of Science degree from Brooklyn College, CUNY in 1960. She completed a master's degree in Experimental Psychology from Radcliffe College in 1964. She went on to complete a PhD in Experimental Psychology from Harvard University in 1966, under the supervision of Charles G. Gross.

Unger was an assistant professor at Hofstra University from 1966 to 1972. During this time, her interests shifted from physiological psychology to social psychology. She joined the faculty of Montclair State College in 1972 and she remained there until her retirement in 1999. Unger was a Fulbright Senior Scholar at the University of Haifa (1988–1989).

Unger married Burton M. Unger, April 11, 1966, and they had two children together. Unger died on April 19, 2019, in Concord, MA.

== Research ==
Unger's major field of inquiry was the psychology of women and gender, and the social construction of gender. Early on in her career, she co-edited the influential textbook Woman: Dependent or Independent Variable? with Florence Denmark and authored the volume Sex-Role Stereotypes Revisited: Psychological Approaches to Women's Studies, which provided a ground-breaking introduction to the psychology of women and sex-role stereotypes.

Unger considered herself an empirical psychologist and focused her research efforts on addressing social problems. She critiqued the constructs of sex and gender and how they were used in research and drew attention to how research methods represent and replicate specific world views. In a seminal paper titled Toward a redefinition of sex and gender, Unger aimed to redefine the terms sex and gender in psychological research by defining sex as a stimulus variable and gender as a collection of characteristics and traits deemed appropriate to males and females. Her emphasis on terminology allowed researchers to focus on sociocultural and environmental factors (e.g., family structure, race-ethnicity, religion) that contribute to, and provide explanations for, differences often presumed to have biological origins.

== Books ==
- Unger, R. K. (1975). Sex-role Stereotypes Revisited: Psychological Approaches to Women's Studies. Harper & Row.
- Unger, R. K. (1979). Female and male: Psychological perspectives. Harper & Row.
- Unger, R. K. (1989). Representations: Social constructions of gender. Baywood.
- Unger, R. K. (1998). Resisting gender: Twenty-five years of feminist psychology. Sage Publications Ltd.
- Unger, R. K. (Ed.). (2004). Handbook of the psychology of women and gender. John Wiley & Sons.
- Unger, R. K., & Denmark, F. (1975). Woman, Dependent or Independent Variable? Psychological Dimensions.
- Crawford, M. E., & Unger, R. K. (Eds.). (2001). In our own words: Writings from women's lives. McGraw-Hill.
- Crawford, M., & Unger, R. K. (2004). Women and gender: A feminist psychology (4th ed.). McGraw-Hill.
- O’Leary, V., Unger, R. K., & Wallston, B. S. (Eds.). (1985). Women, gender, and social psychology. Erlbaum.
