= Robert Louis Kahn =

American psychologist and social scientist (1918–2019)

- Born: March 28, 1918; Detroit, Michigan, U.S.
- Died: January 6, 2019 (aged 100); Burlington, Vermont, U.S.
- Known for: Systems theory, Organizational theory
- Scientific career
- Fields: Psychology, Sociology
- Institutions: University of Michigan

Robert Louis Kahn (March 28, 1918 – January 6, 2019) was an American psychologist and social scientist, specializing in organizational theory and survey research, having been considered a "founding father" of the modern approach to these disciplines. He has also been involved in developing studies on aging and his work is critically acclaimed by experts.

== Biography ==
Kahn was born in Detroit, Michigan on March 28, 1918. He earned his PhD at the University of Michigan and was one of the founding members of the Institute for Social Research. He taught at the University of Michigan from 1948 to 1976, and directed the "Survey Research Center".

In 1963 he was elected as a Fellow of the American Statistical Association. He was president of the Society for the Psychological Study of Social Issues in 1970.

Kahn died in Burlington, Vermont on January 6, 2019.

== Thought ==
Kahn's work on organizational theory, including the book "The Social Psychology of Organizations" (1966) that he co-authored with Daniel Katz, has been described as "a major influence on the field of organizational research, applying a framework of open system theory—the assumption that an organization continuously interacts with its environment—to research on leadership, role behavior, and organizational effectiveness". Kahn has also been appraised as a leading scholar in the study of aging, especially after the publication of "Successful Aging" (1998) that he co-authored with John Wallis Rowe. The book and other pertaining research on the topic by Kahn and collaborators have contributed to the understanding of mechanisms of successful aging.

== Publications ==
- 1966. The Social Psychology of Organizations, co-authored with Daniel Katz.
- 1998. Successful Aging, co-authored with John Wallis Rowe.
