= Daniel Katz (psychologist) =

American psychologist

Daniel Katz (July 19, 1903 – February 28, 1998) was an American psychologist, Emeritus Professor in Psychology at the University of Michigan and an expert on organizational psychology.

== Biography ==
Born in Trenton, New Jersey, Katz received his MA from the University of Buffalo in 1925, and his PhD from the Syracuse University in 1928 under Floyd Henry Allport, founder of the American experimental social psychology.

In 1928 Katz started his academic career at the faculty of Princeton University. In World War II Katz did government research in Washington with a group of social scientists under Rensis Likert, who eventually founded the Institute for Social Research at the University of Michigan. In 1943 Katz went to the Brooklyn College, where he headed the psychology department. From 1947 to 1974 his academic career culminated at the University of Michigan where he was Professor in the Department of Psychology and fellow at the Institute for Social Research. Here Katz cooperated with Theodore Newcomb, who founded Michigan's doctoral program in social psychology and he chaired the program from 1947 to 1953. In honor of both since 1970 the University of Michigan organizes an annual Katz-Newcomb Lecture.

Katz was awarded the Gold Medal of the American Psychological Association, the Lewin Award of the Society for the Psychological Study of Social Issues, the Award of the American Association for Public Opinion Research, the Award of the American Association for Public Opinion Research, and was elected to the American Academy of Arts and Sciences.

Katz raised two daughters with his wife, Christine Ross Braley (m.1930), before dying on February 28, 1998, in Ann Arbor, Michigan.

== Work ==
Katz produced classic studies of racial stereotyping and prejudice, and attitude change, and his pursuit of the connections between individual psychology and social systems helped to found the field of organizational psychology. An important methodological contribution was his open system theory, presented in The Social Psychology of Organizations (1966, later revised), which was co-authored by Robert L. Kahn.

In the late 1960s to the early 1970s, Daniel Katz traveled and worked in Yugoslavia, Greece, and Denmark. He started at the Belgrade Center conducting data collections throughout the republics of Yugoslavia (1968-1969). Katz then began working in Greece soon after. He concluded his time abroad in Denmark at the University of Aarhus where he took up a temporary residency as a visiting professor.

== Publications ==
Books, a selection:

- 1931. Students' attitudes, a report of the Syracuse University reaction study, With Floyd Henry Allport and Margaret Babcock Jenness.
- 1938. Social Psychology, co-authored with Abigail Ayckbourn & Richard L. Schanck
- 1951. Productivity, supervision, and morale among railroad workers, by Daniel Katz [and others]
- 1953. Research methods in the behavioral sciences, edited by Leon Festinger and Daniel Katz.
- 1964. Political parties in Norway; a community study. by Henry Valen and Daniel Katz.
- 1966. The Social Psychology of Organizations, co-authored with Robert L. Kahn
- 1966. Motivation and aspiration in the Negro college. With Patricia Gurin
- 1975. Bureaucratic encounters : a pilot study in the evaluation of government services. Daniel Katz et al.
- 1925-1997. Daniel Katz papers, by Daniel Katz. Collected by Lisa Hum, Mia Butzbaugh, and Gabriela Valdez.

Most cited articles, a selection:

- 1933. "Racial stereotypes of one hundred college students." With K. Braly. In: The Journal of Abnormal and Social Psychology, 1933
- 1935. "Racial prejudice and racial stereotypes". With K.W. Braly. In: Journal of Abnormal and Social Psychology, 1935
- 1959. "A preliminary statement to a theory of attitude structure and change". With E. Stotland. In: Psychology: A study of a science, 1959
- 1960. "The functional approach to the study of attitudes". In: Public opinion quarterly, 1960
- 1964. "The motivational basis of organizational behavior". In: Behavioral science, 1964
