= Mark Hatzenbuehler =

American psychologist

Mark L. Hatzenbuehler
- Born: Mark Louis Hatzenbuehler
- Education: Yale University
- Known for: Research on the effects of social stigma on health
- Scientific career
- Fields: Public health; Psychology
- Workplaces: Harvard University
- Thesis: Mental health disparities in LGB populations: Moving from markers of risk to mediating pathways (2010)
- Doctoral advisors: John F. Dovidio; Susan Nolen-Hoeksema

Mark Louis Hatzenbuehler is the John L. Loeb Associate Professor of the Social Sciences in the Psychology Department at Harvard University. He was previously a tenured associate professor in the Department of Sociomedical Sciences at Columbia University. Much of his research focuses on the effects of social stigma on mental health among members of minority groups. He has received multiple awards from professional societies, including the 2016 Janet Taylor Spence Award from the Association for Psychological Science.
