= Social Issues and Policy Review =

- Discipline: Psychology
- Language: English
- Edited by: Samuel L. Gaertner, Rupert Brown

Publication details
- History: 2007-present
- Publisher: Wiley-Blackwell on behalf of the Society for the Psychological Study of Social Issues
- Frequency: Annual

Standard abbreviations
- ISO 4: Soc. Issues Policy Rev.

Indexing
- ISSN: 1751-2395 (print); 1751-2409 (web)
- LCCN: 2008235587
- OCLC no.: 180771536

Links
- Journal homepage; Online access; Online archive

Social Issues and Policy Review is an annual peer-reviewed academic journal published by Wiley-Blackwell on behalf of the Society for the Psychological Study of Social Issues along with Analyses of Social Issues and Public Policy and the Journal of Social Issues. The journal was established in 2007. The current editors-in-chief are Samuel L. Gaertner (University of Delaware) and Rupert Brown (University of Sussex). The journal covers social issues and public policy.
