= Journal of Social Issues =

- Discipline: Social psychology
- Language: English
- Edited by: Elizabeth R. Cole and Patrick R. Grzanka

Publication details
- History: 1945–present
- Publisher: Wiley-Blackwell on behalf of the Society for the Psychological Study of Social Issues
- Frequency: Quarterly
- Impact factor: 3.424 (2020)

Standard abbreviations
- ISO 4: J. Soc. Issues

Indexing
- ISSN: 0022-4537 (print); 1540-4560 (web)
- OCLC no.: 1782412

Links
- Journal homepage; Online access; Online archive

The Journal of Social Issues is a quarterly peer-reviewed academic journal published by Wiley-Blackwell on behalf of the Society for the Psychological Study of Social Issues along with Analyses of Social Issues and Public Policy and Social Issues and Policy Review. The journal was established in 1945. The editor-in-chief is Martin Ruck (CUNY), and Patrick R. Grzanka and Elizabeth R. Cole are incoming editors (2027–2030). The journal covers human and social issues such as poverty, privacy, youth violence, social class, and education.

According to the Journal Citation Reports, the journal has a 2020 impact factor of 3.424, ranking it 10th out of 44 journals in the category "Social Issues".

A central article on occupational burnout was published in the journal in 1974.
