= Floyd Henry Allport =

American psychologist (1890–1979)

- Born: August 22, 1890; Milwaukee, Wisconsin, US
- Died: October 15, 1978 (aged 88); Los Altos, California, US
- Education: Harvard University
- Known for: Founding social psychology as a behavioral science
- Scientific career
- Fields: Psychology
- Workplaces: Harvard University; Radcliffe College; University of North Carolina at Chapel Hill; Syracuse University; University of California, Berkeley

Floyd Henry Allport (August 22, 1890 – October 15, 1978) was an American psychologist who is often considered "the father of experimental social psychology", having played a key role in the creation of social psychology as a legitimate field of behavioral science. His book Social Psychology (1924) impacted all future writings in the field. He was particularly interested in public opinion, attitudes, morale, rumors, and behavior. He focused on exploration of these topics through laboratory experimentation and survey research.

== Biography ==
Allport was born on August 22, 1890, in Milwaukee, Wisconsin to John Edward and Nellie Allport. Allport was the second of four sons. His three brothers were Fayette W., Harold E., and Gordon W. Allport, also a psychologist. During Allport's childhood, the family moved from Jupiter to Ohio and it was there that he graduated from Glenville High. After high school, Allport moved to Cambridge to attend Harvard University. In 1913, Allport received his A.B. in psychology and in 1919 his Ph.D. at Harvard, he studied under Edwin B. Holt (a student of William James) and Hugo Munsterberg. In between degrees, from October 1917 until June 1918, he served as a lieutenant in the U.S. Army Expeditionary Forces during World War I. Allport's first marriage was to Ethel Margaret Hudson on October 5, 1917. His second marriage to Helene Willey Hartley was on September 5, 1938. Allport had three children: Edward Herbert, Dorothy Fay, and Floyd Henry, Jr.

From 1919 to 1922, Allport was an instructor in psychology at Harvard and Radcliffe, and then until 1924 he was an associate professor at the University of North Carolina at Chapel Hill. Allport became one of the original faculty members at Syracuse University's Maxwell School of Citizenship and Public Affairs in 1924. He was a full professor of Social and Political Psychology until 1956. After 32 years at Syracuse University, Allport became visiting professor at the University of California at Berkeley in 1957. He retired from teaching in that year in Los Altos, California. He died in California on October 15, 1979.

Allport published numerous books and articles in the field of psychology. Three of his most influential books are Social Psychology, Institutional Behavior, and Theories of Perception and the Concept of Structure.

== Professional life ==
Allport remained at Harvard as an instructor for three years after he received his Ph.D., and in 1922 he moved to the University of North Carolina where he accepted an Associate Professorship. There his primary colleague was John F. Dashiell. In 1924, after only two years, Allport left North Carolina and became a Professor of Social and Political Psychology in the brand new Maxwell School of Citizenship and Public Affairs at Syracuse University. The new school at Syracuse recruited Allport specifically in an effort to integrate social scientists to the program. He was immediately appointed Chair of the program, and his efforts at creating the first doctoral program in Social Psychology were supported. Popularity of the Maxwell school rose rapidly after Allport's appointment to Chair. He remained at Syracuse University until he retired in 1957 at the age of 67. While working as a professor, Allport reportedly had very strong relationships with his students. They admired him, he respected their intellectual differences, and he remained in contact with many after their graduations, even occasionally visiting some of their homes.

== Editorial positions ==
Beginning the year after he completed his Ph.D. (1920), Allport worked in editorial positions for numerous academic journals. In 1921, he worked on what was then titled the Journal of Abnormal Psychology. In 1925, that journal expanded to the Journal of Abnormal Psychology and Social Psychology and Floyd continued on there as a Fellow Editor. Quickly it gained popularity and in 1926 became an official periodical of the American Psychological Association. Between 1925 and 1938, he became Associate Editor and continued to work on the publication until 1945. The journal eventually split into two separate publications that persist today: the Journal of Abnormal Psychology and the Journal of Personality and Social Psychology. Allport became a member of the Board of Directors of the American Psychological Association from 1928 to 1930, and worked as a member of the Social Science Research Council from 1925 to 1927, and from 1929 to 1931. In 1931, President Hoover appointed him to serve on the research subcommittee of a conference on Home Building and Home Ownership. He served as President on the Council of Directors for the Society for the Psychological Study of Social Issues from 1938 to 1940.

== Awards ==
Allport achieved the following awards during his career:

- Fellow Status in the American Association for the Advancement of Science
- Distinguished Scientific Contribution Award of the American Psychological Association (1966)
- Gold Medal Award of the American Psychological Foundation (1969)
- Honorary Doctorate from Syracuse University (1974)

== Organizations ==
- Council of Directors of the American Psychological Association (Member).
- Association on the Social Science Research Council (Representative).
- Society for the Psychological Study of Social Science (Chairman).
- President Hoover's Conference on Home Building and Home Ownership.
- Survey Research Center (Consultant)
- Journal of Abnormal and Social Psychology (Acting Editor).
- Associated Artists of Syracuse (President).
- American Psychological Association
- Phi Beta Kappa
- American Association for the Advancement of Science
- American Sociological Association
- Western Psychological Association
- Psychonomic Society
- General System Research

== Social psychology ==
Allport was the founder of the modern field of social psychology. He was the first to write a dissertation in the US on social psychology (called "The social influence: An experimental study of the effect of the group upon individual mental processes"). He challenged much of the way of thinking of his day by focusing on behavioral interpretations of social themes and stressing individuals rather than groups as the agents of social behavior, in which context he coined the terms social facilitation and producing tendency. His work includes research on social influence, convergence and conformity, personality theory, and measurements of attitudes.

His textbook Social Psychology (1924) was the means by which social psychology began to take hold as an experimental science. Instead of stressing sociological issues and themes, which is what had exclusively been done up to this point, Social Psychology emphasized individual behaviors and measurements of attitudes. In this textbook, he called for much stricter research design, after which he developed the methodology that added a greater focus on experimental and objective reactions of individuals. He examined convergence of individual judgment in group settings, reference groups, and group norms through laboratory research. This empirical examination helped to solidify social psychology as a legitimate field of study. Allport also showed how easy it was to transform certain psychoanalytical accounts into more behavior oriented language to explain how we develop certain habits.

Allport also extensively studied attitude. He was unhappy with existing means of attitude measurement so he created an original technique. It provided lists of items that subjects may hold different attitudes on which got ranked from one extreme to another, and then the average rankings on each position were scored. This was one of the first solid efforts of quantifying attitudes, another way that social psychology worked to verify itself within the field of psychological research.

== Research ==
=== "The influence of the group upon association and thought" ===
In this 1920 study, Allport described what we know as social facilitation. He completed six experiments that looked at how individuals performed in social isolation and compared results to how those individuals completed the task in a group. Allport found that individuals perform better when in a group setting as opposed to completing the same/similar task alone.

=== "Personality Traits: Their Classification and Measurement" ===
Floyd Allport and his brother Gordon Allport collaborated on this 1921 paper which outlined the dimensions of the personality assessments that they used while studying personality. They provided information of how they arrived at these classifications and brief examples of what the manifestations of the traits will be in the actual person. The traits were: intelligence, temperament (emotional breadth and strength), self-expression (extro-introversion, ascendance-submission, expansion-reclusion, compensation, insight and self-evaluation) and sociality. The two brothers worked for years to couple personality and social psychology.

=== "The Structuring of Events: Outline of a General Theory With Applications to Psychology" ===
Allport starts this paper off by reviewing how was use quantitative statements while trying to understand behavior, he uses a more mechanistic description of an event. Allport then shows how, when you add something other than a qualitative statement, it is much more clear as to what the circumstance is.In the end, Allport stresses that looking at the structure of the behavior coupled with non-quantitative concepts. Allport derived an equation that combined structural kinematics/geometry (non-quantitative) and structural energics (quantitative).

=== "The Observation of Societal Behaviors of Individuals" ===
Allport focuses on the methodology of involving specific social stimulus that may or may not be presented. Allport described three ways in which societal behaviors may be analyzed, co-acting, reciprocal and co-reciprocal. He questions the definition of time, space, degrees of qualities because they represent large-scale behaviors and not individual traits or differences. Allport believes this method and the results will offer promise of a contribution of practical as well as theoretical value in human relationships.

=== "Social Forces" ===
"Social Forces" was published December 1927. In the nature of institutions section, Allport questions the term "institutions". He gives two examples; institutions can be given a group entitativity and a figure, or they can be simply human behavior broken down into sections. The institutions have three factions. A system is brought from the past, watching and sorting the system and then the accumulated tools used to sort and or observe the system. He makes the point that institutions are not valid to blame or say they can cause things. They may be used as a description but he wants it pointed out that they can be a hindrance to the sociological method.

=== "Behavior and Experiment in Social Psychology" ===
Social stimuli are the main factors in any experimental social psychological setting. The point is to identify the difference in the types of stimuli. The social stimuli lead to the recognition and proof of "social intelligence". A social group's effect on an individual attitude can be notable. Social stimuli then lead to competition, specific attention, quickness, worse quality and physical movement. The conclusion leads to the focus of the individual as the key component towards learning anything about the group.

=== Journal of Abnormal Psychology and Social Psychology ===
The Journal of Abnormal Psychology was renamed the Journal of Abnormal Psychology and Social Psychology in 1921, with reasons given for the combination of abnormal and social psychology. New concepts and behavior terminology led to a separate unique classification. Different specific commonalities were becoming apparent and being tied in relation. The concepts were even being taught but had not been merged to detailed organizational identities. A section of psychology that studies the deepest forms primary human behavior. Social insufficiency was another combination interest. Allport and Prince wanted more factions paired with abnormal psychology and science. The inclusion of social psychology was defined and supported.

== Bibliography ==
- 1920 The Influence of the Group Upon Association and Thought. Journal of Experimental Psychology 3:159–182.
- 1924 Social Psychology. Boston: Houghton Mifflin Company.
- 1925 Allport, Floyd H.; and Hartman, D. A. The Measurement and Motivation of Atypical Opinion in a Certain Group. American Political Science Review 19:735–760.
- 1927 “Group” and “Institution” as Concepts in a Natural Science of Social Phenomena. American Sociological Society Publications 22:83–99.
- 1931 Allport, Floyd H.; and Hartman, D. A. The Prediction of Cultural Change. Pages 307–350 in S. A. Rice (editor), Methods in Social Science. Univ. of Chicago Press.
- 1931 Katz, Daniel; and Allport, Floyd H. Students’ Attitudes: A Report of the Syracuse University Reaction Study. Syracuse, N.Y.: Craftsman Press.
- 1932 Allport, Floyd H.; Dickens, Milton C.; and Schanck, Richard L. Psychology in Relation to Social and Political Problems. Pages 199–252 in Paul S. Achilles (editor), Psychology at Work. New York and London: McGraw-Hill.
- 1933 Institutional Behavior. Chapel Hill: Univ. of North Carolina Press.
- 1934 The J-curve Hypothesis of Con-forming Behavior. Journal of Social Psychology 5:141–183. → The article includes summaries in French and German.
- 1937 Toward a Science of Public Opinion. Public Opinion Quarterly 1:7–23.
- 1952 Morse, Nancy C.; and Allport, Floyd H. The Causation of Anti-Semitism: An Investigation of Seven Hypotheses. Journal of Psychology 34:197–233.
- 1954 The Structuring of Events: Outline of a General Theory With Applications to Psychology. Psychological Review 61:281–303.
- 1955 Theories of Perception and the Concept of Structure. New York: Wiley.
- 1962 A Structuronomic Conception of Behavior; Individual and Collective: 1. Structural Theory and the Master Problem of Social Psychology. Journal of Abnormal and Social Psychology 64:3–30.
