= Lisa E. Bloom =

American cultural critic, educator and feminist art historian

Lisa E. Bloom (born 1958) is an American cultural critic, educator and feminist art historian specializing in polar studies, contemporary art, environmental art, history of photography, visual culture and film studies and is known for her books and essay contributions to these areas.

== Education ==
Lisa E. Bloom earned a B.A. from Trinity College (Connecticut) in art history, a MFA in the History of Photography from the Rochester Institute of Technology and from Visual Studies Workshop and a Ph.D. from the History of Consciousness Program, University of California, Santa Cruz where she did her thesis under the direction of James Clifford, Donna Haraway, and Hayden White. She also has received an Andrew W. Mellon Foundation Postdoctoral Fellowship at Stanford University (1993-1995) and a Postdoctoral fellowship at the Pembroke Center for Teaching and Research on Women at Brown University.

=== Teaching ===
Bloom has taught art history and cultural studies at the University of California, San Diego, Josai International University, the University of California, Irvine; San Francisco State University, San Francisco Art Institute and the University of California, Santa Cruz. She has also been a visiting scholar at the UCLA Center for the Study of Women. She is currently a scholar-in-residence at the Beatrice Bain Center in the department of gender and women’s studies at the University of California, Berkeley.

Bloom’s ongoing work on gender, climate change and the polar regions includes a special issue on polar art of the journal The Scholar and Feminist Online co-edited with Laura Kay and Elena Glasberg (2008), a 2012 article on climate change, art, and the polar regions co-written with Elena Glasberg titled "Disappearing Ice and Missing Data: Visual Culture of the Polar Regions and Global Warming", and a 2015 article on oil and the polar regions titled "Witnessing Climate Change: Oil, Geopolitics and Landscapes of Invisibility". Subsequent articles in 2020 include “Planetary Precarity and feminist environmental art practices in Antarctica,” and her 2021 article “At Memory’s Edge: Climate Trauma in the Arctic Through Film.”

== Books and essay contributions ==
Bloom is the author of many books, including Gender on Ice: American Ideologies of Polar Expeditions (1993), which is the first critical book on the Arctic and Antarctic written from a feminist perspective. This book in polar studies and polar exploration literature was described by the Women's Review of Books as, "...part of a long overdue effort to rewrite the old sexist and racist histories of exploration". Publishers Weekly described it as “making a good case for her intriguing central thesis“.

Her edited anthology titled With Other Eyes: Looking at Race and Gender in Visual Culture (1999), demonstrates how feminist, postcolonial and antiracist concerns can be successfully incorporated into the history of art, and includes essays by Irit Rogoff, Jennifer Gonzalez, Caren Kaplan, Inderpal Grewal, Griselda Pollock, Zoe Leonard, Francette Pacteau, amongst others. Her work on this topic continues in her articles on artists such as Isaac Julien, Eleanor Antin, Connie Samaras, Natalie Talec, and Katja Aglert and in essays on Chinese and Japanese feminist contemporary art in anthologies such as Feminism and Visual Culture, edited by Amelia Jones and in the Visual Culture Reader, edited by Nicholas Mirzoeff.

She is the also the author of Jewish Identities in U.S. Feminist Art: Ghosts of Ethnicity (2006), which explores the place of Jewishness in feminist art in the United States. It was described in the journal Art History as addressing a topic that is under-theorized and difficult to talk about. Her ongoing work in this area includes the essays "Ghosts of Ethnicity: Jewish Identities in American Feminist Art" (2007), and "Barbies’s Jewish Roots: Jewish Women’s Bodies and Feminist Art" (2008).

Bloom’s ongoing work on gender, climate change and the polar regions includes a special issue on polar art of the journal The Scholar and Feminist Online co-edited with Laura Kay and Elena Glasberg (2008), a 2012 article on climate change, art, and the polar regions co-written with Elena Glasberg titled "Disappearing Ice and Missing Data: Visual Culture of the Polar Regions and Global Warming", and a 2015 article on oil and the polar regions titled "Witnessing Climate Change: Oil, Geopolitics and Landscapes of Invisibility".

In her most recent book, Climate Change and the New Polar Aesthetics: Artists Reimagine the Arctic and Antarctic, published in 2022 by Duke University Press, Bloom considers the way artists, filmmakers, and activists in the Arctic and Antarctic represent our current environmental crises and reconstruct public understandings of them. She engages feminist, Black, Indigenous, and non-Western approaches to address the exigencies of the experience of the Anthropocene and its attendant ecosystem failures, rising sea levels, and climate-led migrations. As opposed to mainstream media depictions of climate change that feature apocalyptic spectacles of distant melting ice and desperate polar bears, artists such as Katja Aglert, Subhankar Banerjee, Ursula Biemann, Joyce Campbell, Judit Hersko, Roni Horn, Isaac Julien, Zacharias Kunuk, Brenda Longfellow, Connie Samaras, and activist art collectives (Liberate Tate, Not an Alternative, and the Yes Men), take a more complex poetic and political approach. In their films and visual and conceptual art, these artists link climate change to its social roots in colonialism and capitalism while challenging the suppression of information about environmental destruction and critiquing Western art institutions for their complicity. Bloom’s examination and contextualization of new polar aesthetics makes environmental degradation more legible while demonstrating that our own political agency is central to imagining and constructing a better world. Reference to the publicity to the Duke UP book: https://www.dukeupress.edu/climate-change-and-the-new-polar-aesthetics
