= J. Kēhaulani Kauanui =

American author, radio producer and professor

- Born: July 17, 1968
- Education: University of California, Berkeley (BA) University of California, Santa Cruz (Ph.D)
- Occupations: Activist, author, educator
- Notable work: Hawaiian Blood: Colonialism and the Politics of Sovereignty and Indigeneity Paradoxes of Hawaiian Sovereignty: Land, Sex, and the Colonial Politics of State Nationalism Speaking of Indigenous Politics: Conversations with Activists, Scholars, and Tribal Leaders

J. Kēhaulani Kauanui (born July 17, 1968) is an American author, radio producer and professor. She is one of six co-founders of the Native American and Indigenous Studies Association (NAISA). A Kanaka Maoli (Native Hawaiian) woman, Kauanui was raised in California. She was awarded a Fulbright (1994-1995) at the University of Auckland in New Zealand where she was affiliated with the Māori Studies department. Her research areas focus on indigeneity and race, settler colonialism, decolonization, anarchism, and gender and sexuality.

== Education ==
After attending Irvine Valley College, in 1989 she transferred to the University of California, Berkeley, where she earned her B.A. in Women's Studies in 1992. Kauanui earned her Ph.D. in History of Consciousness at the University of California, Santa Cruz in 2000.

== Professional work ==
Kauanui is the Eric and Wendy Schmidt Professor of Indigenous Studies in Anthropology and the Effron Center for the Study of America at Princeton University in New Jersey. She previously worked as a Professor of American Studies and affiliate faculty in Anthropology at Wesleyan University in Connecticut from 2000 to 2024. She is the author of Hawaiian Blood: Colonialism and the Politics of Sovereignty and Indigeneity (Duke University Press 2008) and Paradoxes of Hawaiian Sovereignty: Land, Sex, and the Colonial Politics of State Nationalism (Duke University Press 2018). She is also the editor of Speaking of Indigenous Politics: Conversations with Activists, Scholars, and Tribal Leaders. The book draws on interviews she conducted for a radio program she produced from 2007 to 2013, “Indigenous Politics: From Native New England and Beyond” on WESU, Middletown, CT. That program was widely syndicated on stations in 13 states through the Pacifica Radio Network.

Kauanui currently co-produces an anarchist politics program, “Anarchy on Air,” which has aired on WESU since 2014, and she was previous part of another anarchist radio collective called The Dream Committee that produced “Horizontal Power Hour” (which aired from 2010 to 2013).

As one of the six co-founders of the Native American and Indigenous Studies Association (NAISA), from 2005 to 2008, Kauanui served on the steering committee to establish the association. She was then elected to the interim council (2008-2009), followed by a three-year term as an elected member of the inaugural council (2009-2012).

Kauanui also sits on the following editorial/advisory boards: American Indian Quarterly; Meridians: Feminism, Race, Transnationalism; Hulili: Multidisciplinary Research on Hawaiian Well-Being; and Intersections: Gender and Sexuality in Asia and the Pacific. She previously served on the editorial boards of Journal of Pacific History; and Settler Colonial Studies.

With Jean M. O’Brien, Kauanui also co-edits a book series, “Critical Indigeneities”, for the University of North Carolina Press.

== Published work ==
Books

- Speaking of Indigenous Politics: Conversations with Activists, Scholars, and Tribal Leaders (University of Minnesota Press 2018)
- Paradoxes of Hawaiian Sovereignty: Land, Sex, and the Colonial Politics of State Nationalism (Duke University Press, 2018)
- Hawaiian Blood: Colonialism and the Politics of Sovereignty and Indigeneity (Duke University Press, 2008)

Essays in Books

- Ethnographies of U.S. Empire, Eds. Carole McGranahan and John Collins (Duke University Press, 2018)
- Critically Sovereign: Indigenous Gender, Sexuality, and Feminist Studies, Ed. Joanne Barker (Duke University Press, 2017)
- Formations of United States Colonialism, Ed. Alyosha Goldstein (Duke University Press 2014)
- A Nation Rising: Hawaiian Movements for Life, Land, and Sovereignty, Eds. Noelani Goodyear-Ka’opua, Ikaika Hussey, Erin Kahunawaika′ala Wright (Duke University Press 2014)
- Recognition, Sovereignty Struggles, and Indigenous Rights in the United States: A Sourcebook, Eds. Amy Den Ouden and Jean M. O’Brien (University of North Carolina Press 2013)
- Decolonizing Native Histories: Collaboration, Knowledge, and Language in the Americas, Ed. Florencia E. Mallon (Duke University Press 2011)
- Beyond the Frame: Women of Color and Visual Representation, Eds. Neferti Tadiar, and Angela Y. Davis (Palgrave Macmillan 2005)
- Asian American Studies After Critical Mass, Ed. Kent Ono (Wiley-Blackwell 2005).

Journal Special Issues

- “Sovereignty,” guest edited Retrospective in Cultural Anthropology (2017)
- “Women Writing Oceania: Weaving the Sails of the Waka,” special issue of Pacific Studies (2007), co-edited with Caroline Sinavaiana
- “Native Pacific Cultural Studies on the Edge,” special issue of The Contemporary Pacific (2001), co-edited with Vicente M. Diaz
- “Migrating Feminisms: The Asia/Pacific Region,” special issue of Women’s Studies International Forum (1998), co-edited with Kalpana Ram

Publications in Journals
American Quarterly, South Atlantic Quarterly, American Studies, Comparative American Studies, Political and Legal Anthropology Review, American Indian Quarterly, Amerasia Journal, Mississippi Review, The Contemporary Pacific, The Hawaiian Journal of History, `Oiwi: Native Hawaiian Journal, Women’s Studies International Forum, and Social Text.
