= International psychology =

International or global psychology is an emerging branch of psychology that focuses on the worldwide enterprise of psychology in terms of communication and networking, cross-cultural comparison, scholarship, practice, and pedagogy. Often, the terms international psychology, global psychology, transnational psychology, and cross-cultural psychology are used interchangeably, but their purposes are subtly and importantly different: Global means worldwide, international means across and between nations, transnational means to transcend the nation-state, cross-cultural means across cultures. In contrast, the term "multicultural" is more often used to refer to ethnic and other cultural differences existing within a given nation rather than to global or international comparisons.

== Definitions and scope ==
International psychology examines the development and application of psychological science across diverse global contexts. It emphasizes collaboration with international and regional organizations such as the International Union of Psychological Science (IUPsyS includes 87 national psychology associations and more than 20 international/regional associations), the International Association of Applied Psychology (IAAP), the International Association of Cross-Cultural Psychology (IACCP), the International Council of Psychologists (ICP), the European Federation of Psychologists' Associations (EFPA: it includes 36 national psychology associations), the Sociedad Interamericana de Psicología (SIP), the recently founded Pan-African Psychological Union (PAPU), and others. In addition, there exist more than 100 international psychology organizations each focusing on a specific subdiscipline. International psychology aims to develop theories, research practices, applications, and ethical guidelines that encompass the psychological study of humanity globally, striving to minimize ethnocentric biases. For an annotated bibliography on international psychology that covers 156 publications, see Harold Takooshian, Uwe P. Gielen, Grant J. Rich, and R. Velayo (2016).

In contrast, the term global psychology focuses on worldwide investigation of global issues and phenomena from a psychological and psychocultural point of view. Examples include the investigation of subjective well being, identification and treatment of mental health problems, the psychological dimensions of family systems, gender roles and gender-typed behavior, childrearing practices, cognitive and emotional functioning, international attitudes, value systems, intergroup conflicts, threats to the natural environment, societal transformation and national development, the struggles of disempowered groups (such as women, children, migrants, and refugees) as seen in a global perspective (Stevens & Gielen, 2007).

Cross-cultural psychology may be defined as the comparative study of behavior and mental processes in different cultures, whereas cultural psychology takes a more relativistic approach. Cross-cultural psychology aims to compare the psychological phenomena between cultures and looks for patterns, generalizability, and culture-specific differentiation (Lonner, 2018; Shiraev & Levy, 2013). An example would be the investigation of child-rearing practices and their psychological consequences between distinctly different groups. Cultural psychology focuses on the relationship between psychology and culture (such as language, traditions, predominant values, and socialization practices) within a culture and how it affects individual human functioning. Both cultural and cross-cultural psychology constitute important elements of global psychology. While cross-cultural psychology emerged as a distinct discipline in the 1960s–1970s, international psychology gained recognition later as a response to globalization and calls for inclusivity in psychological scholarship.

The Oxford English Dictionary (1993) defines global as, "…pertaining to or involving the world, worldwide" (p. 1101) and international as, "Existing, occurring, or carried on between nations…Agreed on by many nations; used by, or able to be used by (the people of) many nations" (p. 1397). At present the term international psychology is in wider use although Stevens and Gielen (2007) prefer the term global psychology, to underline the increasingly global nature of psychological phenomena and problems together with their scientific investigation and efforts to ameliorate them. More generally, the emergence and intensification of an international psychology movement is part and parcel of the broader process of globalization in the scientific, economic, technological, sociocultural, political and ecological spheres. It reflects and makes use of the increasingly global flow of information, ideas, and peoples. In addition, globalization in psychology has led to the de facto use of English as the predominant means of communication so that academics in many parts of the world are now expected to read and publish in English-language journals.

Kurtis, Adams, Grabe, and Else-Quest have proposed a transnational psychology in order to counter the Western bias in the field of psychology. Transnational psychology applies transnational feminist lenses, developed through interdisciplinary work in postcolonial and feminist studies, to the field of psychology to study, understand, and address the impact of colonization, imperialism, and globalization. This approach uses a context-sensitive cultural psychology lens to reconsider, de-naturalize, and de-universalize psychological science. Kurtis and Adams suggested that people in the non-Western, "Majority World" (areas where the majority of the world's population lives), should be viewed as resources for revising traditional psychological science. In addition, Bhatia believes that a transnational cultural psychology is needed examine the psychology of diasporas, who are impacted by globalization and consequently have many "homes," languages, and selves.

It should be added that international psychology, global psychology, and cross-cultural psychology share the common goal of making psychology more universal and less ethnocentric in character, whereas transnational psychology is concerned with uncovering the particularities of the psychology of groups without regard to nation-state boundaries and is opposed to universalization. Historically, American psychology dominated the field post-World War II, often marginalizing non-Western contributions and relying on English-language sources, prompting efforts to diversify scholarship. In addition, reliance on English-language sources contributed to American psychology’s development as a predominantly monocultural and monolingual discipline (Draguns, 2001). Contemporary initiatives prioritize inclusive research methodologies, ethical frameworks adaptable to diverse cultural norms, and pedagogical strategies to internationalize psychology education (Leong, Pickren, Leach, & Marsella, 2012). Practical advice about how best to internationalize the teaching of psychology can be found in the handbooks of Grant J. Rich, Uwe P. Gielen, and Harold Takooshian (2017) and Keith (2018).

== Foci ==
Major foci of international psychology include:

- The worldwide study of psychological processes and phenomena (e.g., Gielen, 2016; Hofstede, 2001).
- Macro-level interventions and policy making, for example, international efforts to reduce HIV infections based on psychological research (Wessells & Dawes, 2007), to assess and reduce ethnic conflicts (Landis & Albert, 2013), and to further global mental health (Patel, Minas, Cohen, & Prince, 2014).
- Micro-level interventions, for example, counseling and psychotherapy, school psychology, and interventions in organizations (e.g., Aycan, Kanungo, & Mendonça, 2014; Moodley, Gielen, & Wu, 2013; Pedersen, Lonner, Draguns, & Trimble, 2015).
- International networking and international psychology organizations and conferences, such as IUPsyS, IAAP, IACCP, EFPA, SIP, APA's Division 52 – International Psychology, APA's Office of International Affairs, and the Institute for International and Cross-Cultural Psychology (IICCP) (Merenda, 1995).
- Supporting efforts to internationalize psychology education by infusing global, international, and cultural perspectives into the curriculum, providing international and cross-cultural training experiences, increasing international faculty and student exchange, and forming collaborative research programs (Heine, 2016; Leong et al., 2012; McCarthy, Dickson, Cranney, Trapp, & Karandashev, 2012; Rich & Gielen, 2015; Rich, Gielen, & Takooshian, 2017; Takooshian, Gielen, Plous, Rich, & Velayo, 2016).
- Rewriting the history of psychology from a global and less ethnocentric point of view, together with corresponding changes in the curriculum (Baker, 2012; Brock, 2007; Leong et al., 2012; Rich & Gielen, 2015; Takooshian, Gielen, Plous, Rich, & Velayo, 2016).
- Establishing shared training standards, professional regulations, and codes of ethics (Pettifor, 2007; Leach, Stevens, Lindsay, Ferrero, & Korkut, 2012), such as the Universal Declaration of Ethical Principles for Psychologists (2008), which has been adopted by the IUPsyS and its 87 national member organizations (Leach, Stevens, Lindsay, Ferrero, & Korkut, 2012).
- Representing psychology at the United Nations especially in the context of non-governmental organizations (NGO's). An important step in this regard was taken in 2012, when The Psychology of NGOs Accredited at the United Nations (PCUN) was established by a group of psychology-based NGOs. These NGOs advocate for the inclusion of psychological perspectives, research, and practice, for instance when formulating and implementing the UN's Sustainable Development Goals.
- Based in part on the advocacy of psychologists such as Judy Kuriansky, Chair of the Psychology Coalition of NGOs at the United Nations, mental health and well-being have for the first time been included in the UN 2030 Agenda for Sustainable Development. Supported by the World Bank Group and the World Health Organization (2016), mental health specialists are now succeeding in moving mental health issues from the periphery closer to the center of worldwide efforts to improve global health.

== History ==
Modern scientific psychology had an international dimension from its beginnings in the late 19th century. Wilhelm Wundt (1832-1920), for instance, the father of modern experimental psychology, supervised approximately 190 doctoral students from at least 10 countries. Similarly, the First International Congress of Physiological Psychology in 1889, in Paris, included more than 200 participants from 20 countries (Sabourin & Cooper, 2014). Although psychology developed first in Europe, it soon began to prosper in the United States as well. Altogether, modern scientific psychology remained a predominantly western enterprise till well after World War II although modern psychology was already present in the early 1900s in some nonwestern countries such as India, Japan, and Mexico. The emigration of German and Austrian psychologists to the United States during the 1930s strengthened American psychology’s global influence. However, this consolidation also led to a focus on English-language scholarship and Western-centric perspectives (see David and Buchanan, 2003, and Bullock, 2012, for timelines of important events in the history of international psychology). In recent years, U.S. psychologists have shown increased awareness of the importance of incorporating global developments to better represent the field worldwide. For instance, the American Psychological Association established in 1997 an International Psychology Division (Division 52), which currently has about 600 members.

Over the past four decades, psychology has expanded significantly worldwide. Stevens and Gielen (2007) and some others have estimated that there are over one million psychologists. This estimate is based on local definitions of what it means to be a professional psychologist: in most countries the prerequisite is a Master's degree or Diploma in psychology, whereas in others (e.g., Brazil) a professionally oriented Bachelor's degree that incorporates a period of supervised practice enables one to gain admission to a licensing examination. The global estimate includes well over 320,000 psychologists in Europe, at least 250,000 in Latin America, and approximately 225,000 in the United States. The country with the highest density of psychologists is Argentina. In addition, psychology has gained ground in East and Southeast Asia and is increasingly visible in Muslim countries such as Turkey, Egypt, Jordan, Iran, and Lebanon (Ahmed & Gielen, 1998; Baker, 2012; Stevens & Wedding, 2004). In sub-Saharan Africa, psychology is well developed in South Africa, but less present though expanding in the other regions. For more detailed information, see the edited volume by Stevens and Wedding (2004) which includes analyses of the status of psychology in 27 countries located on all inhabited continents. The handbook by Baker (2012) reviews the respective histories of psychology in 27 countries and regions around the world while the volume by Rich and Gielen (2015) focuses on 17 past and present pathfinders in the realm of international psychology. The contributions respectively to Moodley, Gielen, and Wu (2013) and Gerstein et al. (2009) analyze the status of counseling psychology and psychotherapy in numerous countries.

In general, psychology has historically thrived in affluent, urbanized societies, while mental health care in poorer, rural regions often prioritizes physical health over psychological well-being. (Leung & Zhang, 1995; O'Gorman, Shum, Halford, & Ogilvie, 2012). Such problems are frequently treated by indigenous healers who tend to rely on supernatural explanations for their identification and treatment. However, a global mental health movement that has been strongly influenced by psychiatrists is gathering steam. This makes it likely that in the future, greater resources will be allocated to mental health problems especially in medium-income countries (Patel et al., 2014). Countries where psychology is both influential and especially well developed include The Netherlands, Switzerland, Israel, Germany, the United States, the United Kingdom, Australia, Indonesia, Austria, the Scandinavian countries, and Argentina (known for its strong psychoanalytic tradition).

== Trends ==
Perhaps the best measure of trends within international psychology is within its organizations, through new membership, conference topics, and cooperative research across borders. For example, the International Union of Psychological Science (IUPsyS) has seen an increase of new member countries from Africa, Asia, Eastern Europe, and Latin America in the past 15 years; membership in such organizations represents a desire and need in these countries for networking, training, accreditation, expansion of scientific research, and international recognition (Stevens & Gielen, 2007). Correspondingly, international psychology conferences are now increasingly taking place in both Western and non-Western countries. IUPSyS's quadrennial International Congresses of Psychology (ICP), for instance, have been and will be taking place in Beijing (2004), Berlin (2008), Cape Town (2012), Yokohama (2016), and Prague (2020). Similarly, the quadrennial Congresses of Applied Psychology offered by IAAP, the largest international psychology organization for individual members, have taken or will take place around the globe in cities such as San Francisco (1998), Singapore (2002), Athens (2006), Melbourne (2010), Paris (2014), and Montreal (2018).

Trends in global psychology point to the sustained growth, specialization, and feminization of psychology, and the emergence of contextually sensitive paradigms.

The number of psychologists, psychology students, and psychology programs worldwide continues to grow steadily, proving that one of the goals of globalization is being met. However, much work still needs to be done to bring psychology to underdeveloped areas, and to increase the resources and development of the field in countries where it has already taken hold (Adair & Kağitçibaşi, 1995; Stevens & Wedding, 2004).

Specialization is a growing trend, with each nation focusing specializations on its own needs and goals. Also, communication within these specializations is being facilitated through the World Wide Web and the emergence and growth of specialized international organizations and journals in subfields of psychology. Although access to the Internet is frequently still limited in low-income countries, it has nevertheless improved considerably in recent years thus facilitating the exchange of scientific and professional information as well as research data. The Journal of Cross-Cultural Psychology, for instance, is increasingly publishing papers by large teams of international psychologists that compare psychological phenomena across numerous countries located on all inhabited continents. Moreover, high impact psychological journals published in North America and Europe have broadened their scope by increasingly accepting articles by international and non-Western authors including those residing in East Asian countries.

Feminization in psychology is another trend, as women are beginning to dominate the field in Europe, Latin America, Canada, the United States, and parts of Asia. A trend within this trend is the continued dominance of male psychologists within business and academia, whereas women tend to work more frequently in school, counseling, and clinical settings.

Finally, with the globalization of psychology comes the demand for more culturally sensitive paradigms (Heine, 2016). Traditionally, psychology was taught in the Western context, reflecting the norms, values, and data of those particular regions. Increasing awareness that this psychology does not sufficiently address culturally specific as well as global issues and therefore does not fully apply to some cultures has led to the call for indigenous psychologies, or at least an alternative psychology to the mainstream, reductionistic paradigm which may be applied to most, if not all, cultures (Kim, Yang, & Hwang, 2006). Prominent centers of indigenous psychology include Mexico, the Philippines, South Korea, and Taiwan. Moreover, the increasing inclusion of globally collected data of psychological relevance is gradually undermining the traditionally ethnocentric nature of psychology as taught in the United States and elsewhere in the West (e.g., Hofstede, 2001). Theoretically, indigenous psychologists emphasizing culturally sensitive paradigms tend to see themselves as cultural rather than as cross-cultural psychologists. Moreover, global psychology profits from an emphasis on interdisciplinary cooperation with experts from fields such as cultural and psychological anthropology, sociology, behavioral economics, and political science. This holds true because behavior patterns are generally influenced by a broad array of forces that may vary from society to society.

== Professional regulations and ethical standards ==
Many countries around the world have professional regulations for the practice of psychology. "With some exceptions, the existence of professional regulation reflects the level of development of professional psychology in that country. A profession needs to establish an identity and credibility before there is something to be regulated" (Pettifor, 2007, p. 312). In the 36 European countries represented in EFPA, a major effort is underway to unify the basic academic curriculum as well as other requirements underlying the training and certification of psychologists. These countries have established specific yet wide-ranging guidelines for a European Diploma in Psychology comparable to a Master's level university education of six years duration that includes supervised practice. The diploma will enable psychologists trained in one country to practice in other European countries and is likely to influence the education and practice of psychologists in other parts of the world as well.

Countries that currently have limited or no regulation of the profession include India, Iran, Japan, Kenya, Kuwait, Nigeria, Pakistan, the Philippines, Poland, Russia, Singapore, Thailand and Turkey. Several of these countries are working toward licensing legislation, and several have developed ethical standards of practice to guide. Many national psychology associations have adopted a code of ethics such as, for instance, APA's Ethical Principles of Psychologists and Code of Conduct. EFPA has adopted several codes of ethics in recent years, and the five Nordic countries (Denmark, Finland, Iceland, Norway, and Sweden) adopted a unified code of ethics in 1988, which they revised in 1998 to be more consistent with EFPA's meta-code (Pettifor, 2007). Moreover, IUPsyS and IAAP adopted, in 2008, a Universal Declaration of Ethical Principles for Psychologists. Such codes and declarations tend to be aspirational in nature.

== Conclusion ==
The scope of scientific psychology and its practice have expanded enormously from its early beginnings in the 19th century to today. This holds true for all post-industrial countries and increasingly for some modernizing nations such as Brazil, China, India, Indonesia, Mexico, the Philippines, and Turkey. In contrast, psychology remains much less visible in the poorer countries and especially so in their rural areas. The expansion of psychology into the nonwestern world has led to an increasing awareness of the role of cultural factors in psychological functioning together with repeated calls to "indigenize" psychology (Kim, Yang, & Hwang, 2006). International contacts among psychologists as well as joint research and applied projects across national and geographic boundaries have prospered thanks to the rapidly evolving technologies of transportation and electronic communication. Consequently, one may safely predict that the cross-cultural, global, and international dimensions of psychology will become more prominent in the foreseeable future.

== Representative journals and newsletters ==
- Applied Psychology: An International Journal (IAAP)
- Asian Journal of Social Psychology (Asian Association of Social Psychology/Japanese Group Dynamics Association)
- European Psychologist (EFPA)
- International Journal of Psychology (IUPsyS)
- International Perspectives in Psychology: Research, Practice, Consultation (APA Division 52)
- International Psychologist (ICP)
- International Psychology Bulletin (APA Division 52)
- Journal of Cross-Cultural Psychology (IACCP)
- Psychology International www.apa.org/pi
- Revista Interamericana de Psicología/Interamerican Journal of Psychology (SIP)

== Additional References and Further Reading ==
- Adair, J. G.; Kağitçibaşi, Ç. (1995). "National development of psychology: Factors facilitating and impeding progress in developing countries (Special Issue)". International Journal of Psychology. 30 (6). doi:10.1080/00207599508246591.
- Ahmed, R. A.; Gielen, U. P., ed. (1998). Psychology in the Arab countries. Menoufia, Egypt: Menoufia University Press. [Revised Arabic edition appeared in 2006.]
- Aycan, Z., Kanungo, R. N., & Mendonça, M., ed. (2014). "Organizations and management in cross-cultural context." London, UK: Sage.
- Baker, D. B., ed. (2012). The Oxford handbook of the history of psychology: Global perspectives. New York: Oxford University Press.
- Brock, A. C., ed. (2007). Internationalizing the history of psychology. New York: New York University Press.
- Bullock, M. (2012). "International psychology". In Freedheim D. K.; Weiner B. (eds.). Handbook of psychology: History of psychology. Vol. 1 (2nd ed.). Hoboken, NJ: Wiley. pp. 562–596.
- David, H. P.; Buchanan, J. (2003). "International psychology". In Freedheim, D. K. (ed.). Handbook of psychology: History of psychology. Vol. 1. New York: Wiley. pp. 509–533.
- Drabble, M.; Stringer, J., ed. (1993). Oxford dictionary of the English language. Oxford, UK: Oxford University Press.
- Draguns, J (2001). "Toward a truly international psychology: Beyond English only". American Psychologist. 56 (11): 1019–1030. doi:10.1037/0003-066x.56.11.1019. PMID 11785148.
- Gerstein, L.H.; Heppner, P.P.; Northworthy, K.L.; AEgisdóttir, S.; Leung, S-M. A., ed. (2009). International handbook of cross-cultural counseling: Cultural assumptions and practices worldwide. Thousand Oaks, CA: Sage.
- Gielen, U. P.; Bredenkamp, J., eds. (1997). "Psychology in the German-speaking countries". World Psychology. 3 (3–4).
- Gielen, U. P. (2016). "The cross-cultural study of human development: A skeptical yet optimistic historical introduction." In Gielen, U. P. (Ed.); Roopnarine, J. L. (Ed.), Childhood and adolescence: Cross-cultural perspectives and applications. (2nd ed.). Santa Barbara, CA: Praeger. pp. 3–45.
- Heine, S. J. (2016). Cultural psychology (3rd ed.). New York: W. W. Norton.
- Hofstede, G. (2001). Culture's consequences: Comparing values, behaviors, institutions, and organizations across nations (2nd ed.). Thousand Oaks, CA: Sage.
- Kim, U.; Yang, K.-S.; Hwang, K. K., eds. (2006). Indigenous and cultural psychology: Understanding people in context. New York: Springer.
- Keith, K. D. (2018). Culture across the curriculum: A psychology teacher's handbook. Cambridge, UK: Cambridge University Press.
- Landis, D.; Albert, R. D., ed. (2013). Handbook of ethnic conflict. New York: Springer.
- Leach, M. M., Stevens, M. J., Lindsay, G., Ferrero, A., & Korkut, Y. (2012). The Oxford handbook of international psychological ethics (Oxford Library of Psychology). New York: Oxford University Press.
- Leong, F. T. L.; Pickren, W. E.; Leach, M. M.; Marsella, A. J., ed. (2012). Internationalizing the psychology curriculum in the United States. New York: Springer.
- Leung, K.; Zhang, J. (1995). "Systemic considerations: Factors facilitating and impeding the development of psychology in developing countries". International Journal of Psychology. 30 (6): 693–706. doi:10.1080/00207599508246595.
- Liu, J. H.; Ng, S. H. (2007). "Past contributions, current status and future prospects for Asian social psychology". Asian Journal of Social Psychology. 10 (1). Blackwell: 1–7. doi:10.1111/j.1467-839X.2006.00204.x.
- Lonner, W. J. (2018). The continuing growth of cross-cultural psychology: A first-person annotated chronology. Cambridge, UK: Cambridge University Press.
- Marsella, A. J. (2007). "Education and training for a global psychology". In Stevens, M. J.; Gielen, U. P. Toward a global psychology: Theory, research, intervention, and pedagogy. Mahwah, NJ: Lawrence Erlbaum Associates. pp. 333–361.
- McCarthy, S., Dickson, K. L., Cranney, J., Trapp, A., & Karandashev, V., eds. (2012). "Teaching psychology around the world" (vol. 3). Newcastle upon Tyne, UK: Cambridge Scholars Publishing.
- McCormick, M. A., & Constantable, M. R. (2015). International psychology. PowerPoint downloaded on Nov. 20, 2015 from https://www.apa.org/education/k12/intl-psyshort.ppt.
- Merenda, P. F. (1995). "International movements in psychology: The major international associations of psychology". World Psychology (1): 27–48.
- Moodley, R.; Gielen, U. P.; Wu, R., eds. (2013). Handbook of counseling and psychotherapy in an international context. New York: Routledge.
- O'Gorman, J., Shum, D. H. K., Halford, W. K., & Ogilvie, J. (2012). World trends in psychological research output and impact. International Perspectives in Psychology: Research, Practice, Consultation. 1(4): 268-283.
- Patel, V., Minas, H., Cohen, A., Prince, M. J., eds. (2014). Global mental health: Principles and practice. Oxford, UK: Oxford University Press.
- Pawlik, K.; Rosenzweig, M. R., eds. (2000). International handbook of psychology. Thousand Oaks, CA: Sage.
- Pedersen, P. B.; Lonner, W. J.; Draguns, J. G.; Trimble, J. E.; Scharron-del Rio, M., eds. (2015). Counseling across cultures (7th ed.). Thousands Oaks, CA: Sage.
- Pettifor, J. L. (2004). "Toward a global professionalization of psychology". In Stevens, M. J.; Gielen, U. P. (eds.). Toward a global psychology: Theory, research, intervention, and pedagogy. Mahwah, NJ: Lawrence Erlbaum Associates. pp. 299–331.
- Rich, G., & Gielen, U. P., eds. (2015). Pathfinders in international psychology. Charlotte, NC: Information Age Publishing.
- Rich, G., Gielen, U. P., & Takooshian, H., eds. (2017). Internationalizing the teaching of psychology. Charlotte, NC: Information Age Publishing.
- Sabourin, M.; Cooper, S. (2014). "The first International Congress of Physiological Psychology (Paris August 1889) The birth of the International Union of Psychological Science". International Journal of Psychology. 49 (3): 222–232. doi:10.1002/ijop.12071. PMID 24821513.
- Sexton, V. S.; Hogan, J. D., eds. (1992). International psychology: Views from around the world. Lincoln, NE: University of Nebraska Press.
- Shiraev, E. B., Levy, D. A., eds. (2013). Cross-cultural psychology: Critical thinking and contemporary applications. (5th ed.) Boston: Pearson.
- Stevens, M. J.; Gielen, U. P., eds. (2007). Toward a global psychology: Theory, research, intervention, and pedagogy. Mahwah, NJ: Lawrence Erlbaum Associates.
- Stevens, M. J.; Wedding, D., eds. (2004). Handbook of international psychology. New York: Brunner-Routledge.
- Stevens, M. J.; Wedding, D., eds. (2009). Psychology: IUPsyS global resources (CD-ROM) (10th ed.). Hove, UK: Psychology Press.
- Takooshian, H., Gielen, U. P., Plous, Rich, & Velayo, R. S. (2016). Internationalizing undergraduate psychology education: Trends, techniques, and technologies. "American Psychologist", "71" (2), 136-147.
- Takooshian, H., Gielen, U. P., Rich, G. J., & Velayo, R. S. (2016). International psychology. In D. S. Dunn, ed. "Oxford bibliographies in psychology." New York: Oxford University Press. doi:10.1093/OBO/9780199828340-0184
- Wessells, M. G.; Dawes, A. (2007). "Macro-social interventions: psychology, social policy, and social influence processes". In Stevens, M. J.; Gielen, U. P. (eds.). Toward a global psychology: Theory, research, intervention, and pedagogy. Mahwah, NJ: Lawrence Erlbaum Associates. pp. 267–298.
- World Bank Group. (2016). Out of the shadows: Making mental health a global priority. Retrieved from http://www.worldbank.org/en/events/2016/03/09/out-of-the-shadows-making-mental-health-a-global-priority
