= Dinesh Sharma (academic) =

Indian-American author and academic (born 1964)

Dinesh J Sharma
- Born: Dinesh J Sharma; February 8, 1964 (age 62); New Delhi, India
- Education: Loyola University Chicago (BA, MA); Harvard University (PhD); Columbia University (Postdoctoral researcher)
- Occupations: Author and Academic
- Employer(s): Steamworks Studios, Fordham University, Walden University

Dinesh Sharma is an American social scientist, psychologist, academic and entrepreneur in the fields of human development and rights, leadership and globalization. Sharma's recent books include, “The Global Obama: Crossroads of Leadership in the 21st Century” and most recently “The Global Hillary: Women's Political Leadership in Cultural Context."

Currently, Sharma is Director and Chief Research Officer at Steam Works Studio, an education technology venture in Princeton, New Jersey, and works with K-12 populations in private and public schools. Sharma is a contributing faculty member at Fordham University, New York University, and Walden University, where he teaches and advises students; he has served as an Associate Professor (Adjunct) in Human Rights, Political Science and Psychology at John Jay College, New York City; Cross-Cultural Consultant at Fordham University's Institute for Research, Service, and Teaching (FIRST), founded by Professor Harold Takooshian; and a Senior Fellow at Institute for International and Cross-Cultural Psychology at St. Francis College, New York.

== Education and career ==
Sharma graduated in 1996 with a Doctorate from Harvard University in Human Development and Psychology. Sharma has led sessions and written papers on Psychological and Cultural Anthropology. Sharma has recently edited a book of collected essays on Robert A. LeVine's life's work, the Cultural Psyche, with contributions from leading psychological anthropologists (including Byron J. Good, Richard Shweder, Thomas S. Weisner, and Parker Shipton.

Sharma was on a NIMH Post-Doctoral Fellowship in 1999 at Columbia University and then worked in the private sector for more than a decade. Prior to Sharma's time at Harvard, he received his Bachelor of Arts in psychology, Pre-Medicine and Philosophy (1986) and Master of Arts in Clinical Psychology from Loyola University in Chicago, IL (1990).

Sharma has served since 2003 as a senior fellow at the Institute for International and Cross-Cultural Psychology founded by Uwe Gielen at St. Francis College in New York City. Sharma was an Associate Research Professor (Hon.) at the Institute of Global Cultural Studies founded by Ali Mazrui, SUNY Binghamton, where Sharma taught in the Department of Psychology; Politics, Philosophy and Law; and Human Development at Harpur College. Sharma has also taught courses as adjunct professor at Fordham University at Lincoln Center entitled, “The UN and Global Leadership” and "EQ and Global Leadership." The courses delved into the intricate consensus process at the United Nations, a part of the organizational leadership program.

Sharma is the author and editor of seven books as well as many journal articles, His book: “Barack Obama in Hawaii and Indonesia: The Making of a Global President, was rated as the Top 10 Black History Book for 2012 by the American Library Association.

In October 2013, Sharma was invited as a speaker for a program at Akademy Ke Polisi PTKI in Jakarta, Indonesia (2013). The topic of the speech was about Barack Obama under the title The Global Obama: Leadership in The 21st Century In 2011, Sharma was invited to lecture with Democrats Abroad through ten countries of the European Union. Sharma received the medal of honor from the New York Society for Behavioral Research, an award where the honorees are chosen based on colleagues and students’ nominations.

In May 2025, Sharma was recognized with the "Excellence in Education Award" at the USA edition of the Education 2.0 Conference, acknowledging his work in the field of education.

== Media appearances ==
Sharma has been interviewed or was a featured speaker at multiple media events and interviews. and was a columnist for Asia Times Online, The Global Intelligence, and contributor to various other websites (e.g., Al Jazeera English). Sharma has also written frequently for Psychology Today, Eastern Eye, and provided commentary on SABC and NewzroomAfrika.

== Views and opinions ==
Sharma explores the psychological significance of ancient ruins like Hampi, stating that such sites connect the past, present, and future, prompting reflection on self, time, and mortality, while emphasizing that these spaces evoke a sense of temporal transience often absent from daily life and noting that entire sites, rather than individual artifacts, offer insight into changing lifestyles and the passage of time.

Sharma has critiqued the limitations of emotional intelligence (EI) in complex, multicultural workplace settings, arguing that EI addresses basic emotional understanding but falls short in navigating multilateral and cross-cultural dynamics.

== Personal life ==
Sharma currently resides in Princeton, New Jersey, with his wife, son and daughter; he continues to work in the private sector, while always teaching and writing. He is presently a board member of the International Council of Psychologists, Psychological Coalition at the UN (PCUN), and Manhattan Psychological Association.

== Selected bibliography ==
- LeVine, Robert A.; Sharma, Dinesh (2021). The Cultural Psyche: The Selected Papers of Robert A. LeVine on Psychosocial Science. Charlotte, NC: Information Age Publishing, Inc. ISBN 978-1-64802-412-2.
- Sharma, Dinesh, ed. (2016). The Global Hillary: Women's Political Leadership in Cultural Contexts. Leadership: research and practice series (1st ed.). New York: Routledge Taylor & Francis Group. ISBN 978-1-138-82973-2.
- Sharma, Dinesh; Gielen, Uwe P., eds. (2014). The Global Obama: Crossroads of Leadership in the 21st Century. Leadership : research and practice series. New York, NY: Routledge/Taylor & Francis Group. ISBN 978-1-84872-625-3.
- Sharma, Dinesh (2014). Psychoanalysis, Culture, and Religion: Essays in Honour of Sudhir Kakar. Santa Barbara, Calif: Oxford University Press. ISBN 978-0-198-07698-8.
- Sharma, Dinesh (2011). Barack Obama in Hawai'i and Indonesia: The Making of a Global President. Santa Barbara, Calif: Praeger. ISBN 978-0-313-38533-9.
- Sharma, Dinesh (2004). Human Technogenesis: Cultural Pathways through the Information Age: New Directions for Child and Adolescent Development, Number 105 (J-B CAD Single Issue Child & Adolescent Development). Santa Barbara, Calif: Jossey-Bass. ISBN 978-0-787-97779-5.
- Sharma, Dinesh (2004). Childhood, Family, and Sociocultural Change in India: Reinterpreting the Inner World. Santa Barbara, Calif: Oxford University Press. ISBN 978-0-195-66460-7.
- Sharma, Dinesh, ed. (2003). Childhood, Family, and Sociocultural Change in India: Reinterpreting the Inner World. New Delhi; New York: Oxford University Press. ISBN 978-0-19-566460-7.
- Sharma, Dinesh, ed. (1998). Socioemotional Development Across Cultures (New Directions for Child Development No 81). New York: Jossey-Bass. ISBN 978-0-78-791248-2.
