= Jacqueline Livingston =

American photographer

Jacqueline Louise Livingston
- Born: August 1943; Phoenix, Arizona
- Died: June 21, 2013 (aged 69); Ithaca, New York
- Education: Arizona State University
- Occupation: Photographer

Jacqueline Louise Livingston (August 1943 – June 21, 2013) was an American photographer known for her work exploring woman's role as artist and person and investigating the boundaries of intimacy and propriety.

== Life and career ==
Born Jaqueline Louise Barrett in Phoenix, Arizona in August 1943, reared in Chandler, Arizona and schooled at Arizona State University, with her then husband, John Livingston, she organized Students for a Democratic Society on the ASU campus in the mid-1960s, spearheading the major SDS activities of civil rights demonstrations, education about corrupt government practices, and protests against the war in Vietnam.

In the mid-1970s, Livingston began exploring male sexuality in her work as "a way to overcome the distance she felt from the male body" producing a serious of images including naked images of her son, husband, and father-in-law. Livingston's goal was to create a series that addresses the gender imbalance in nude photos as well as empowering her own sexuality by creating “sexy” images that appeal to her heterosexuality, challenging the social perception women's sexuality and art production. She was a photography and art professor at Cornell University until she was fired by the university in the summer of 1978 because of publicity over a series of photographs of her son in nude and masturbatory poses. Upon inquiring as to the cause of her dismissal, Livingston reported she was supposedly told by the chair of the art faculty, "You can't be a feminist and expect to be on this campus - furthermore, you can't photograph male genitalia." Demonstrating, the issue of censorship and cultural repression of transgressive photographic works, which was common within the 1900s because of the introduction of pornography laws.

Connie Samaras, a feminist writer and artist who is a professor of art at UC Irvine, writes:

Of all her images, though, it was this series of her then six-year-old son masturbating which caused her the most trouble. Like many photographers, Livingston was in the habit of photographing her child since birth. Thus, by the time he reached six, he was completely comfortable with the camera. Moreover, Livingston and his father tried to provide a climate for their son in which nudity was nothing to be ashamed of. The images you're looking at are a grid of nine photographs of her young son sitting cross-legged. His head has been cropped and the focal point is his torso. As Livingston was taking these her son began to masturbate spontaneously, a sight, I'm sure, not unfamiliar to any parent. Rather than shaming her son into stopping or shaming herself into not taking pictures, Livingston continued to photograph.

Livingston viewed her work as a means to change prescriptive notions about women's sexuality and women's artistic production, not as a vehicle to transcend an unalterable material world.

Discussing child rearing, Livingston states that:

Wilhelm Reich's book The Mass Psychology of Fascism influenced my thinking about child rearing. According to Reich, being raised in sexual freedom (i.e. masturbation is healthy, premarital sex and sex education are a person's human right) is the first step in structuring personalities who will not follow authority.

Although never formally charged, Livingston became one of the first targets of the newly created child pornography legislation that took effect in the late seventies. She was threatened with prosecution under child pornography laws, and was investigated by the U.S. Department of Social Services for alleged child abuse, after the American Society for the Prevention of Cruelty to Children charged her with producing child pornography. By 1980, however, the charges were dropped.

In mid-1982 Livingston and Leo Brissette opened a gallery in SoHo in New York City as a one-year project, which was kept under surveillance by the FBI.

Between 1980 and 1985, she was part of a lengthy class-action lawsuit (Zahorik vs. Cornell University) against Cornell, alleging sex-based employment discrimination. In 1985, Livingston, writing in the Cornell Daily Sun, claimed that the dean had warned the chief plaintiff, Donna Zahorik, not to pursue litigation because the university would "destroy her emotionally and financially." After five years of litigation and the expense of $2.5 million in legal fees by the university, the suit was settled out of court for a derisory sum. Livingston later stated that the members of the class action suit were embarrassed to have her as one of the litigants and told her to "stop photographing nudes." In 2009 she has her last exhibition in National Museum in Gdansk (Poland) titled "Family Album. Spaces of Intimacy".

Livingston was diagnosed with breast cancer in 1992 and was subsequently involved with organizing a breast cancer support group called the Ithaca Breast Cancer Alliance.

She died in Ithaca, New York.

== Work ==
Of her work, critic Jonathan Green writes:

Livingston's photographs reverse, or at least equalize, the usual relationship of male dominance and female submission; they also invert the method of traditional extended portrait, in which the male photographer focuses on the nude female.

Her work is in the collections of major museums including the Metropolitan Museum of Art in New York, and the Museums of Modern Art in New York and San Francisco and the National Museum, Gdańsk.
