= Dinesh Sharma =

Dinesh Sharma may refer to:

- Dinesh Sharma (politician) (born 1964), Indian politician
- Dinesh Sharma (academic), social scientist, psychologist and author
- Dinesh Sharma (actor) (born 1970), Nepalese film actor, producer and director
