= Transnational psychology =

Branch of psychology

Transnational psychology is a branch of psychology that applies postcolonial, context-sensitive cultural psychology, and transnational feminist lenses to the field of psychology to study, understand, and address the impact of colonization, imperialism, and globalization, and to counter the Western bias in the field of psychology. Transnational psychologists partner with members of local communities to examine the unique psychological characteristics of groups without regard to nation-state boundaries.

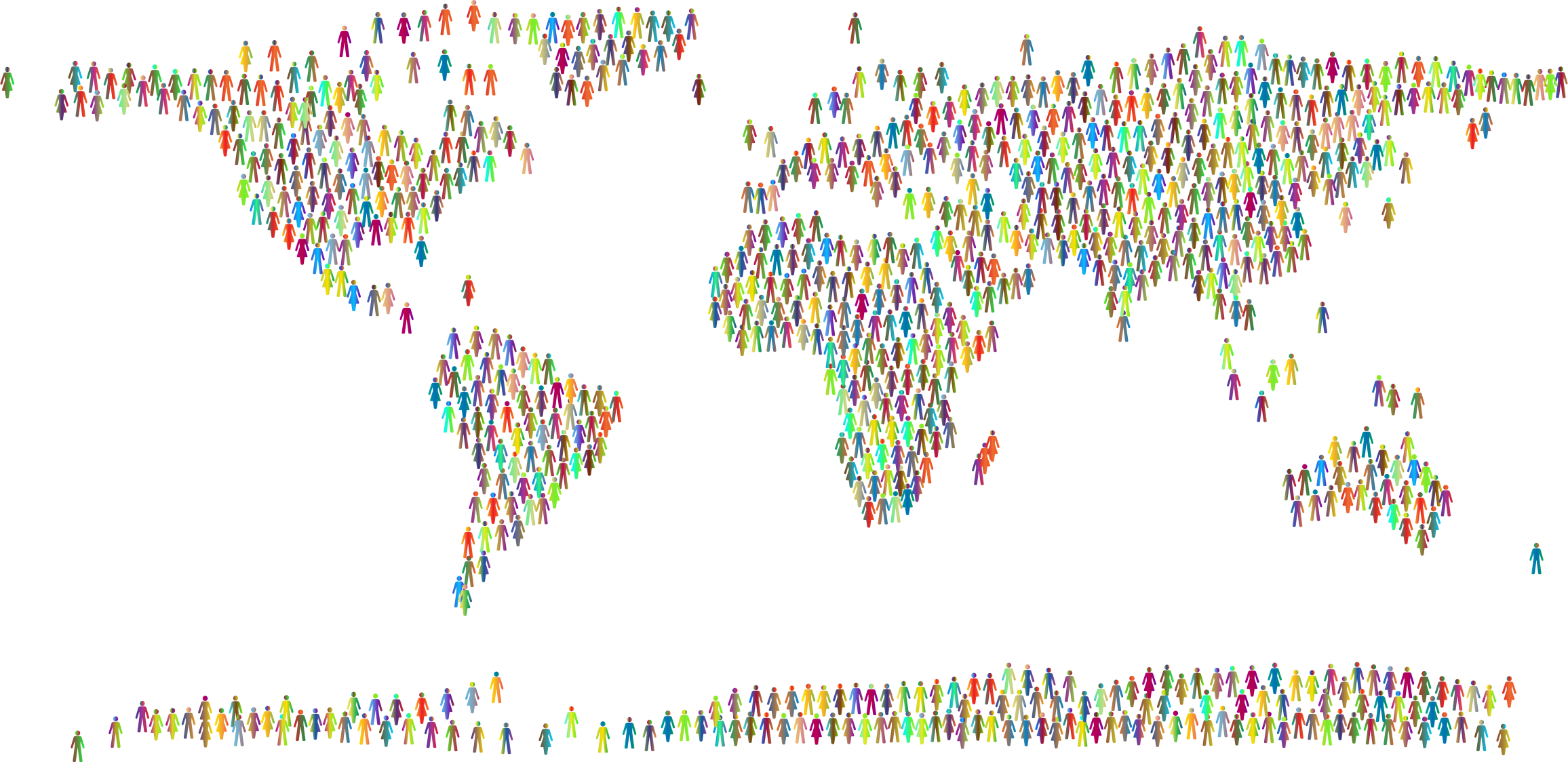
Transnational psychology

As articulated by Kurtis, Adams, Grabe, Else-Quest, Collins, Machizawa and Rice, transnational psychology aims to counter the Western bias in the field of psychology. Kurtis and Adams proposed applying the principles of transnational feminism and using a context-sensitive cultural psychology lens to reconsider, de-naturalize, and de-universalize psychological science. They identified people in the non-Western, "Majority World" (areas where the majority of the world's population lives) as valuable resources for revising traditional psychological science. Transnational psychology is essentially synonymous with transnational feminist psychology. Both transnational feminism and transnational psychology are concerned with how globalization and capitalism affect people across nations, races, genders, classes, and sexualities. The transnational academic paradigm draws from postcolonial feminist theories, which emphasize how colonialist legacies have shaped and continue to shape the social, economic, and political oppression of people across the globe. It rejects the idea that people from different regions have the same subjectivities and recognizes that global capitalism has created similar relations of exploitation and inequality. A 2015 Summit organized by Machizawa, Collins, and Rice further developed transnational psychology by inspiring presentations and publications that applied transnational feminist principles to psychological topics.

International psychology, global psychology, and cross-cultural psychology share the common goal of making psychology more universal and less ethnocentric in character, whereas transnational psychology is concerned with uncovering the particularities of the psychology of groups without regard to nation-state boundaries and is opposed to universalization.

== Transnational intersectionality ==
Grabe and Else-Quest proposed the concept of "transnational intersectionality" that expands current conceptions of intersectionality, adding global forces to the analysis of how oppressive institutions are interconnected. In addition, Bhatia believes that a transnational cultural psychology is needed examine the psychology of diasporas, who are impacted by globalization and consequently have many "homes", languages, and selves. This movement asks to critique the ideologies of traditional white, classist, western models of psychology practices from an intersectional approach and how these connect with labor, theoretical applications, and analytical practice on a geopolitical scale.

== WEIRD bias ==
Scholars have noted that most of the articles in American Psychological Association journals are about largely white, US populations, despite U.S. citizens only constituting about 5% of the world's population. Arnett (2008) pointed out that psychologists have no grounds for assuming psychological processes are universal and generalizing research findings to the rest of the global population. Henrich, Heine, and Norenzayan (2010) noted that although only 1/8 of people worldwide live in regions that fall into the WEIRD (western, educated, industrialized, rich and democratic) societal classification, 60–90% of psychology studies are performed on participants from these areas. They gave examples of results that differ significantly between people from WEIRD and tribal cultures, including the Müller-Lyer illusion. Arnett (2008), Altmaier and Hall (2008), and Morgan-Consoli et al. (2018) all view the Western bias in research and theory as a serious problem considering psychologists are increasingly applying psychological principles developed in WEIRD regions in their research, clinical work, and consultation with populations around the world. In 2018, Rad, Martingano and Ginges stated that nearly a decade after Henrich et al.'s (2010) paper, over 80% of the samples used in studies published in the journal Psychological Science were from the WEIRD population. Their analysis also showed that several studies did not fully disclose the origin of their samples, and the authors offer a set of recommendations to editors and reviewers to reduce the WEIRD bias.

== See also ==
- Transnational feminism
- International psychology
- Feminist psychology
- Critical psychology
- Liberation psychology
- Psychology
- Feminism
- Feminist movements and ideologies
