= Lisa Parks =

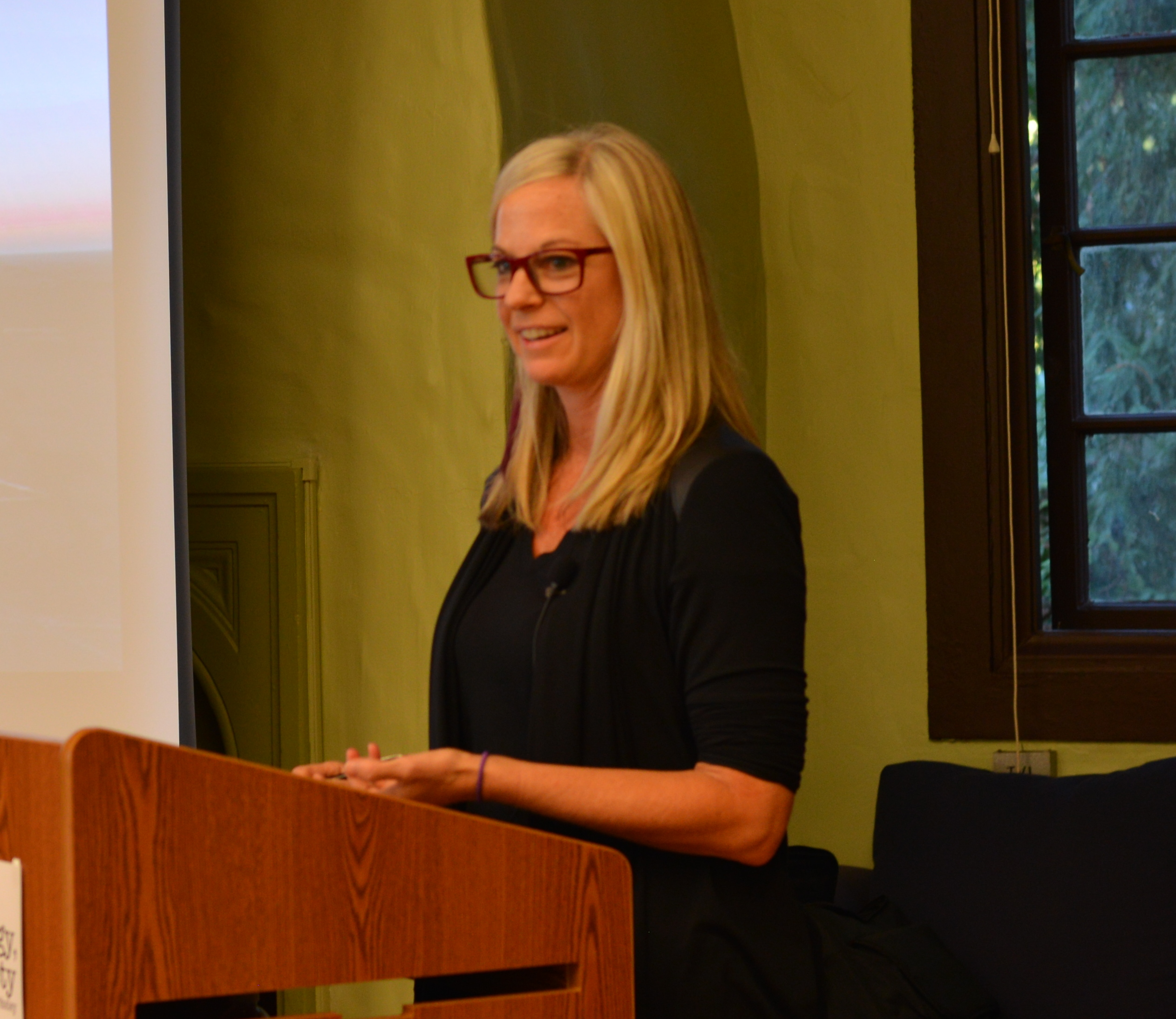
- Lisa Parks at UC Berkeley Center for New Media in 2013
- Title: Distinguished Professor of Film and Media Studies
- Awards: MacArthur Fellowship

Academic background
- Education: University of Montana
- Alma mater: University of Wisconsin–Madison
- Thesis: Cultures in Orbit: Satellite Technologies, Global Media and Local Practice (1998)

Academic work
- Discipline: Media Studies
- Institutions: University of California, Santa Barbara; Massachusetts Institute of Technology
- Notable students: Nicole Starosielski
- Main interests: Media, information technology, globalization, surveillance
- Notable works: Cultures in Orbit: Satellites and the Televisual
- Website: lisaparks.net

Lisa Ann Parks is Distinguished Professor of Film and Media Studies and Director of the Global Media Technologies & Cultures (GMTaC) Lab at the University of California at Santa Barbara. She was formerly Professor of Comparative Media Studies and Science, Technology and Society at the Massachusetts Institute of Technology, where she founded the GMTaC Lab. She won a MacArthur "Genius" Fellowship in 2018 for "exploring the global reach of information technology infrastructures".

== Contributions ==
Parks's research examines the effects of technologies such as satellites, remote sensing, and drones on society. Her 2005 book Cultures in Orbit: Satellites and the Televisual showed how the rise of satellites in television, warfare, and astronomy led to a more globalized understanding of the world among viewers, but also provided new opportunities to filter what people could see. Choice praised Cultures in Orbit as a "fascinating study of satellite information gathering" but also noted that "the book's academic, jargon-filled style puts this interesting discussion beyond the reach of inexperienced readers."

In 2018 she published the book Rethinking Media Coverage: Vertical Mediation and the War on Terror, which explores how TV news, airport checkpoints, satellite imagery, and drone media generate forms of "'coverage' that make vertical space intelligible to global publics in new ways and powerfully reveals what is at stake in controlling it." Parks also co-edited the books Life in the Age of Drone Warfare with Caren Kaplan and Signal Traffic: Critical Studies of Media Infrastructures with Nicole Starosielski. Parks explores "how greater understanding of media systems can inform and assist citizens, scholars and policymakers in the US and abroad to advance campaigns for technological literacy, creative expression, social justice, and human rights."

== Education and career ==
Parks grew up in Missoula, Montana and earned a bachelor of arts in Political Science and History at the University of Montana. She earned her Ph.D. from the University of Wisconsin–Madison in 1998. She worked at the University of California, Santa Barbara from 1998 to 2016, moved to MIT in 2016, and returned to UCSB in 2020.

== Works ==
- (Co-editor, with Shanti Kumar) Planet TV: A Global Television Reader (New York University Press, 2003) ISBN 9780814766927
- Cultures in Orbit: Satellites and the Televisual (Duke University Press, 2005) ISBN 9780822334972
- (Co-editor, with James Schwoch) Down to Earth: Satellite Technologies, Industries, and Cultures (Rutgers University Press, 2012) ISBN 9780813553337
- (Co-editor, with Nicole Starosielski) Signal Traffic: Critical Studies of Media Infrastructures (University of Illinois Press, 2015) ISBN 9780252080876
- (Co-editor, with Caren Kaplan) Life in the Age of Drone Warfare (Duke University Press, 2017) ISBN 9780822369738
- Rethinking Media Coverage: Vertical Mediation and the War on Terror (Routledge, 2018) ISBN 9780415999823
- Also see Lisa Parks Academia.edu website
