= Banu Bargu =

American philosophical philosopher

- Known for: Political Theory, Political Philosophy, Human Shields, Biopolitics

Academic background
- Education: Cornell University (Ph.D., 2008)
- Influences: Michel Foucault, Max Stirner, Karl Marx, Niccolò Machiavelli, Louis Althusser

Banu Bargu is a U.S.-based political theorist and professor of History of Consciousness and Politics at the University of California, Santa Cruz.

== Career ==
Bargu completed her B.A. at Boğaziçi University in 1997, where she also completed her M.A. in Political Science and International Relations in 2000. She then studied at Cornell University, where she completed her Ph.D. in Government in 2008.

Bargu taught at The New School in New York City for a decade before entering the History of Consciousness department at the University of California, Santa Cruz in 2018. In her 2014 paper "Sovereignty as Erasure: Rethinking Enforced Disappearances" she discusses Kemal Birlik, who disappeared while in Turkish custody.

In 2014, Bargu published her first book, Starve and Immolate: The Politics of Human Weapons through Columbia University Press. The book is about the Turkish Death Fast. Bargu discusses what she calls the "weaponization of life", beginning with the imprisonment of leftist political prisoners in Turkey and then broadening her analysis to discuss Hamas, PKK, and other organizations. Hannah Gehl writes that "Bargu wishes to communicate that self-destructive acts and the use of human weapons is a logical and premeditated political statement against the asymmetric distribution of political power". Bargu develops a concept of "necroresistance" which Anna Terwiel has described as "a new understanding of martyrdom as a radical challenge to the modern state". It received the First Book award by the American Political Science Association. She subsequently edited the volume, Feminism, Capitalism, and Critique: Essays in Honor of Nancy Fraser. The essays in the anthology examine the work of Nancy Fraser. It was published by Palgrave in 2017.
