= History of Consciousness =

Department at the University of California, Santa Cruz

- Parent institution: University of California, Santa Cruz
- Website: https://histcon.ucsc.edu/

History of Consciousness is the name of a department in the Humanities Division of the University of California, Santa Cruz with a 60 year history of interdisciplinary research and student training in "established and emergent disciplines and fields" in the humanities, arts, sciences, and social sciences based on a diverse array of theoretical approaches. The program has a history of well-known affiliated faculty and of well-known program graduates.

== History ==
The program was started in 1965, during the first year of the Santa Cruz campus, in a rather informal manner. A small group of faculty members, including the American historian Page Smith, philosopher Maurice Natanson, culture theorist Harry Berger, Jr., and psychology professor Bert Kaplan approached the University of California system-wide Graduate Council with a proposal for a new type of graduate program for the new campus. According to the founding Chancellor of the campus, Dean McHenry, they did not consult with him and the program was approved without his input.

For over a decade, there were no direct faculty appointments to the program and all faculty teaching in the program was done by members of established Boards of Studies (at the time, the UC Santa Cruz equivalent of departments). This led to problems in budgeting and program continuity, and coupled with the unorthodox interdisciplinary nature of the program, it also presented challenges in placing History of Consciousness graduates in teaching jobs. The appointment of Norman O. Brown as Professor of Humanities in 1968 was in part intended to address some of these concerns.

The first graduate student in History of Consciousness was Harvey Rabbin. Perhaps the best-known graduate of the program is Huey P. Newton, co-founder of the Black Panther Party. Newton received his Ph.D. in 1980.

== Faculty ==
Historians Hayden White and James Clifford were among the first faculty members directly appointed to the department. White joined the faculty as Professor of History of Consciousness and Chair of the Board in July, 1978, having been recruited by then-Chancellor Angus Taylor to bring stability to the program.

In addition to White and Clifford, Donna Haraway, Angela Davis, Barbara Epstein, Stephen Heath, Fredric Jameson, Teresa de Lauretis and Gary Lease joined the program, while professors in other disciplines taught "HistCon" courses, supervised HistCon graduate students, and participated in new graduate student admissions. Among those most active at this time were political theorists J. Peter Euben, Robert Meister and John Schaar as well as philosopher David Hoy. Other notable faculty who have taught in the program include Karen Barad, Victor Burgin, Isaac Julien, Herbert Marcuse, David S. Marriott, Kobena Mercer, Gayatri Chakravorty Spivak and Neferti Tadiar.

As of November 2021, the department's faculty include Banu Bargu, Chris Connery, Carla Freccero, Robert Meister, Eric Porter, and Massimiliano Tomba. In 2018, Gopal Balakrishnan was the subject of an investigation regarding his violation of the university's sexual harassment policy. He was ultimately found guilty of violating it and was fired from the university. As of September 2023, the department's faculty expanded, including Robert Nichols, Dimitris Papadopoulos, and Maria Puig de la Bellacasa.

== Notable graduates ==
- William Drea Adams
- Bettina Aptheker
- Joanne Barker
- Thomas Bass
- Julian Bleecker
- Lisa E. Bloom
- Greg Calvert
- Ron Eglash
- S. Lochlann Jain
- Caren Kaplan
- Noelani Goodyear-Ka'opua
- J. Kēhaulani Kauanui
- Carol Mavor
- Stephen Nachmanovitch
- Huey P. Newton
- Marisa Olson
- Mike Rotkin
- Chela Sandoval
- Ruth Frankenberg
- Katie King
- Andrea Smith
- Sandy Stone
- Marita Sturken
- Kim TallBear
- Eva Simone Hayward
- Teresia Teaiwa
- Michael Tobias
- Howard Winant

== See also ==
- Contentious politics
  - Revolution
  - Social movements
- Critical race theory
- Feminist theory
- Film theory
- Marxism and anarchism
- Philosophy
- Psychoanalysis
- Political economy
- Postmodernism
- Science studies
- Visual culture
