= Nicole Starosielski =

American author, researcher

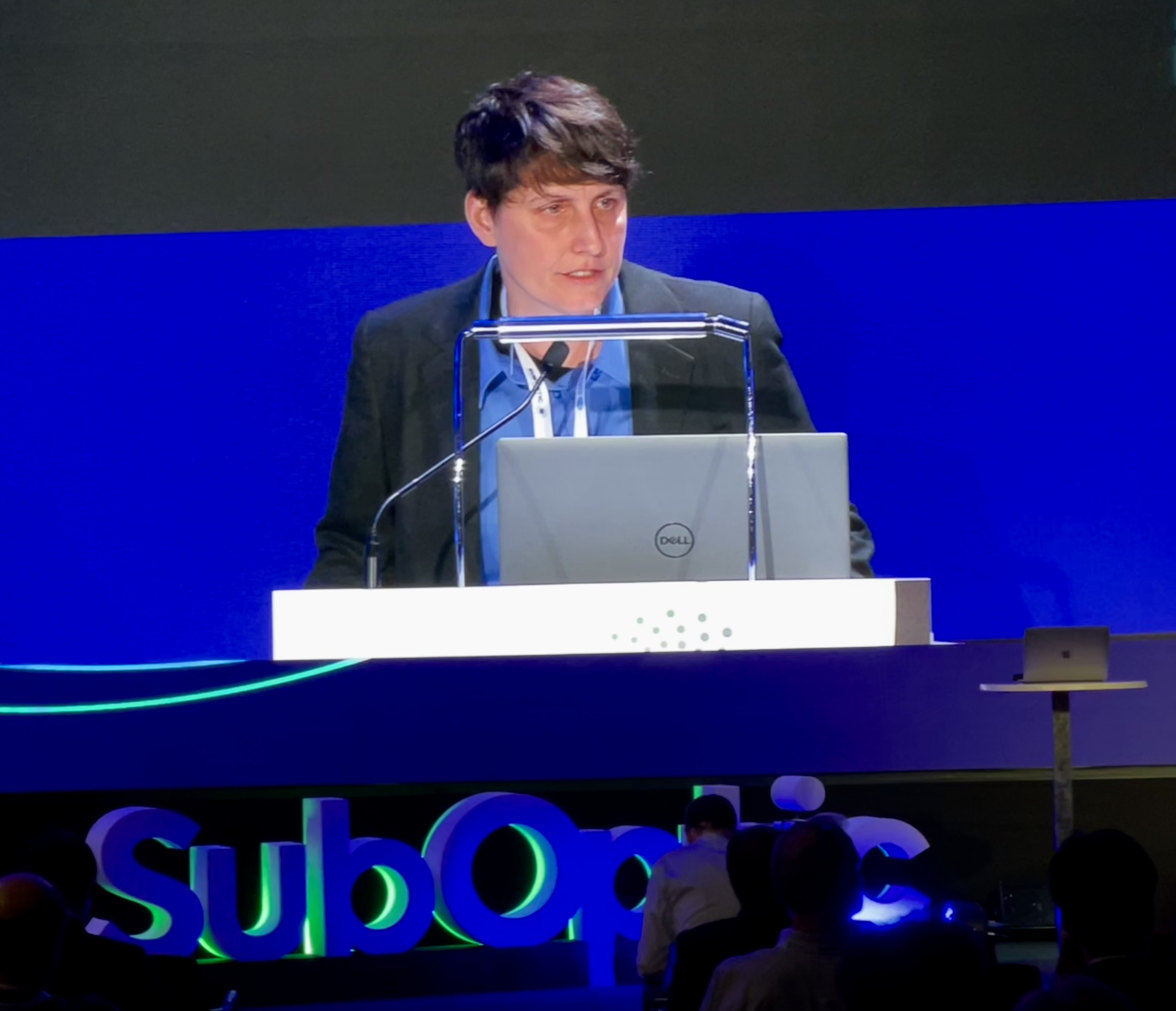
- Starosielski speaking during the Second Congress on Sustainability at SubOptic 2025 in Lisbon, Portugal
- Title: Professor

Academic background
- Education: University of Southern California (BA), University of California, Santa Barbara (MA, PhD)
- Doctoral advisor: Lisa Parks

Academic work
- Discipline: Science and Technology Studies, Media Studies, Environmental Studies, Cultural Studies, Geography
- Institutions: University of California, Berkeley; New York University; Miami University
- Main interests: Telecommunication Networks, Digital Infrastructures, Sustainability, Globalization, Media and Technology Industries
- Notable works: The Undersea Network (2015), Media Hot and Cold (2021).

Nicole Starosielski is an American author, researcher, and professor at the University of California, Berkeley. She conducts research on global internet and media distribution, communications infrastructures ranging from data centers to undersea cables, and media’s environmental and elemental dimensions. Her best-known contribution foregrounds the global subsea cable industry, the sector responsible for the planetary network that carries about 99% of transoceanic data traffic, analyzing its socio-technical organization, market dynamics, governance structures, and sustainability efforts.

She is currently a Principal Investigator for the Sustainable Subsea Networks research project, an academic-industry partnership by the SubOptic Foundation and funded by the Internet Society Foundation. As part of this engagement, Starosielski and her team of doctoral students and collaborators developed a catalog of best practices for sustainability in the subsea cable industry. This includes the first comprehensive study on the carbon footprint of subsea cable networks and the main factors influencing cable sustainability. In December 2023, the project was featured at the COP28, the United Nations Climate Change Conference in Dubai, becoming the first time sustainability surrounding submarine cables was addressed in the history of the conference.

Her first book, The Undersea Network(2015), and her online project Surfacing are widely cited by journalists around the world covering issues of internet infrastructures, especially in relation to geopolitics, including Russia-US relations, US-China Relations, and growing debates over cybersecurity. Her work has been featured in Scientific American, interviewed on National Public Radio’s Science Friday and The Takeaway, and covered by Wired Magazine and The Guardian, showcasing mainstream resonance beyond academia.

== Academic career ==
In 2005, Starosielski graduated from the University of Southern California with Bachelor's degrees in Cinema Television and English. She continued her education at University of California, Santa Barbara, earning both a Master's degree and PhD in Film and Media Studies. After completing her degrees, Starosielski became an Assistant Professor of Communication at Miami University for one year. Following this, she began a career as an Associate Professor of Media, Culture, and Communication at New York University Steinhardt where she taught between 2012 and 2023. In the summer of 2023, she joined the faculty of the Department of Film and Media Studies at the University of California, Berkeley, as a full professor.

She currently serves on the Executive Committee of the Berkeley Center for New Media (UC Berkeley College of Engineering), and is a member of the Faculty Steering Committee of the Berkeley Space Center, a proposed 36-acre innovation center at NASA Ames Research Center at Moffett Federal Airfield in California's Silicon Valley. Starosielski is also a co-convenor of the SubOptic Association’s Global Citizen Working Group.

Starosielski is author or co-editor of over thirty articles and five books on media, infrastructure, and environments, including: The Undersea Network (2015), Media Hot and Cold (2021), Signal Traffic: Critical Studies of Media Infrastructure (2015), Sustainable Media: Critical Approaches to Media and Environment (2016), Assembly Codes: The Logistics of Media (2021), as well as co-editor of the “Elements” book series at Duke University Press.

== The Undersea Network and Surfacing ==
In her book The Undersea Network, Starosielski examines the underwater telecommunications cable infrastructure that allows the internet to operate. The book covers the history of the cables, as well as the geography of the underwater network. In addition, the book discusses the cultural, political, and environmental implications of underwater cable infrastructure. The Undersea Network includes an analysis of the contingencies of the internet as well as information network myths and challenges. Starosielski argues that the environments the cables occupy are historical and political realms, where the network and the connections it enables are made possible through deliberate negotiation and manipulation of technology, culture, politics and geography. She traces the cable systems from the ocean depths to their landing zones on beaches in the South Pacific, bringing visibility to the materiality of the wired network that is often taken for granted in our "wireless" world.

“If we think of the Internet as only a virtual environment, then our conception of how to change it will depend on changing only the virtual world. This study of undersea cables, the material infrastructure of the Internet, has led in contrast to a set of tangible policies and politics (...) It involves a call for state support for new cable networks, the triangulation of currents between existing nodes, and the expansion of networks’ potential uses (...) Together, these politics and policies would instead give traction to more broadly robust, resilient, and equitable global networks.”

--Nicole Starosielski, from The Undersea Network (2015)

Surfacing is a website designed as a companion to Starosielski's book. The project was developed by Nicole Starosielski, Erik Loyer, and Shane Brennan, with additional writing from Jessica Feldman and Anne Pasek. The website shows non-lineal archival photographs along with text and information about various areas and countries that are connected through the Pacific's underwater cable network. Surfacing also discusses the history of the underwater cable network and some of the modern day challenges of the system.

== Works ==
- "Things & Movies: DVD Store Culture in Fiji.” (2010)
- "‘Movements that are Drawn’: A History of Environmental Animation from The Lorax to FernGully to Avatar." (2011)
- "Beaches, Fields, and other Network Environments." (2011)
- "Critical Nodes, Cultural Networks: Re-mapping Guam’s Cable Infrastructure.” (2012)
- "Warning: Do Not Dig’: Negotiating the Visibility of Critical Infrastructures." (2012)
- "Beyond Fluidity: A Cultural History of Cinema under Water.” (2012)
- "Network Archaeology" with Braxton Soderman and Cris Cheek. (2013)
- "Signal Tracks." (2014)
- "The Materiality of Media Heat." (2014)
- Signal Traffic: Critical Studies of Media Infrastructures (2015)
- The Undersea Network (2015) OCLC 891123817
- "In our Wi-Fi world, the internet still depends on undersea cables." (2019)
