= Joanne Barker =

Lenape academic focusing on Indigenous peoples' studies

Academic background
- Education: University of California, Santa Cruz (PhD)

Academic work
- Discipline: Indigenous studies
- Sub-discipline: Indigenous feminism; Indigenous rights
- Institutions: San Francisco State University

Joanne Barker (Lenape, citizen of the Delaware Tribe of Indians) is a Lenape academic focusing on Indigenous peoples' studies. She became a faculty member within the American Indian Studies Department at San Francisco State University, in 2003. Much of her work focuses on indigenous feminism and the sovereignty and self determination of indigenous peoples. Her work takes a transnational approach, making connections between and across the borders of countries. Barker makes historical and scholarly connections between the oppression and resistance of marginalized communities. An example of this transnational approach can be seen by the work that Barker has done to show connections in the struggles of Palestinians in Israel and indigenous communities in the United States.

== Education and career ==
Joanne Barker received her PhD in the History of Consciousness Department from the University of California, Santa Cruz, in 2000 where she specialized in indigenous jurisprudence, women's/gender studies, and cultural studies. Barker is a professor of American Indian Studies at San Francisco State University.

=== Activism ===
In her work as an advocate for Native Americans, Barker has drawn connections between the oppression of Native American communities in the United States of America and Palestinians. She began drawing parallels between the two groups of peoples after a 2014 delegation trip to Israel. Barker wrote that Palestinian activist Leila Khaled "defined solidarity as a strategy of connecting struggles of the people in the U.S. against U.S. imperialism and colonialism to the struggles of Palestinians against Israel". Barker also advocates for cultural repatriation rights, human rights, anti-war politics, and environmental issues. With environmental issues, Barker specifically focused on energy policies and conservation issues in relation to indigenous tribes in California. She covers some of her advocacy in her blog, Tequila Sovereign, where she also discusses current events, her scholarship, and artwork.

== Awards ==
- Rockefeller Foundation Humanities Fellowship
- Ford Foundation Postdoctoral Fellowship (2005-2006)

== Publications ==
=== Books ===
Joanne Barker is the author of one book and the editor of two books of essays. She has made the majority of her published work available to the public through her Academia.edu account. Her book, The Red Scare: The Empire's Indigenous Terrorist, is published by University of California Press in 2021. In this book she explored the ways that racist and misogynist representations of indigenous people cause them to be seen as "terrorists," and a threat to the social order of the United States of America and Canada.

Barker is the editor of Critically Sovereign: Indigenous Gender, Sexuality, and Feminist Studies. The essays in this book deal with the overarching theme of the ways that gender is an inextricable part of colonialism and imperialism within the United States and Canada. Throughout this book there are also discussions of the role that gender, sexuality and feminism play in movements towards indigenous sovereignty. This book was published in 2017 through Duke University Press.

Native Acts: Law, Recognition, and Cultural Authenticity was published in 2011 by Duke University Press. In this book, Barker discusses the way that indigenous people must look and act in certain ways to earn federal recognition from the United States. Barker argues that these acts of "cultural authenticity" often reproduce social injustices (racism, homophobia, sexism, etc.) that are fundamental to American nationalism.

Barker edited the book Sovereignty Matters: Locations of Contestation and Possibility in Indigenous Struggles for Self-Determination, which was published in 2005 by Lincoln: University of Nebraska Press. This book is a collection of essays by indigenous people from the Americas and the Pacific Islands. This book discusses sovereignty as political, cultural, and intellectual- expanding beyond just the relationship between indigenous groups and their colonized states.

=== Articles and chapters ===
- "Decolonizing the Mind," Rethinking Marxism 30, no. 2 (2018), 208-231.
- “Territory as Analytic: The Dispossession of Lenapehoking and the Subprime Crisis,” Social Text (June 2018): 19-39.
- "The Corporation and the Tribe," American Indian Quarterly 39, no. 3 (Summer 2015), 243-270.
- "Self-Determination," Critical Ethnic Studies Journal 1, no. 1 (Spring 2015), 11-26.
- “Indigenous Feminisms.” Handbook on Indigenous People's Politics. José Antonio Lucero, Dale Turner, and Donna Lee VanCott, eds. (New York: Oxford University Press, forthcoming; chapter available on-line as of January 2015).
- “The Specters of Recognition.” Formations of United States Colonialism. Alyosha Goldstein, ed. (Durham and London: Duke University Press, 2014).
- “Gender.” The Indigenous World of North America. Robert Warrior, ed. (New York: Routledge Press, 2014).
- "Gender, Sovereignty, and the Discourse of Rights in Native Women's Activism," Meridians: feminism, race, transnationalism 7, no. 1 (2006), 127-62. Reprinted as: "Women’s Work: Gender, Sovereignty, and the Discourse of Rights in Native Women's Activism." Indigeneity. John Brown Childs and Guillermo Delgado-P., editors. (Santa Cruz, CA: The Literary Guillotine Press, 2012). "Gender, Sovereignty, and the Discourse of Rights in Native Women's Activism." Rethinking Canada: The Promise of Women's History. Sixth Edition. Mona Gleason, Adele Perry, and Tamara Myers, editors. (New York: Oxford University Press, 2010). "Gender, Sovereignty, Rights: A Note On Native Women's Activism Against Social Inequality and Violence in Canada," American Quarterly 60, no. 2 (2008).

=== Documentaries ===
- Director/writer/co-producer. A Child's Place: In Palestine. uncivilized films/myrmuring films, 2016 (1:09).
- Director/writer/co-producer. We Will Stay Here: The Al-Kurds of Sheikh Jarrah. uncivilized films/myrmuring films, 2016 (1:05).
- Director/writer/co-producer. Political Prisoners in Palestine. uncivilized films/myrmuring films, 2016 (1:45).

=== OpEds ===
- "No Thanks: How the Thanksgiving Narrative Erases the Genocide of Native People." TruthOut. November 26, 2015.
- “The True Meaning of Sovereignty.” Tribal Rights v. Racial Justice (Cherokee Freedom). New York Times: Room for Debate. September 15, 2011.

=== Fiction ===
- The Dawn of War: A Novella (2018).
- Chitkuwi: A Novella (2017).
- There Are No Stories About the Future: A Collection of Short Stories About the Future (2017).
