= Katie King (professor) =

American women's studies professor

- Born: Katherine Ruth King
- Occupation: Professor
- Title: Professor Emerita

Academic background
- Education: University of California, Santa Cruz
- Thesis: Canons without Innocence: Academic Practices and Feminist Practices Making the Poem in the Work of Emily Dickinson and Audre Lorde (1987)
- Doctoral advisor: Donna Haraway

Academic work
- Discipline: Women’s studies
- School or tradition: History of Consciousness
- Institutions: University of Maryland, College Park
- Notable works: Theory in its Feminist Travels; Networked Reenactments
- Website: katiekin.weebly.com

Katherine Ruth King, known as Katie King, is a scholar of women's studies and author. She is professor emerita in the Harriet Tubman Department of Women's Studies at the University of Maryland, College Park and author of two books: Theory in its Feminist Travels (1994) and Networked Reenactments (2011).

== Biography ==
King earned a BA in literature and anthropology from the University of California, Santa Cruz in 1975. As an undergraduate she was in Cowell College. She then spent three years in the doctoral program at the University of Chicago's Committee on Social Thought, before ultimately returning to Santa Cruz where she earned her PhD in 1987 from the History of Consciousness department. Donna Haraway supervised King's dissertation, entitled Canons Without Innocence: Academic Practices and Feminist Practices Making the Poem in the Work of Emily Dickinson and Audre Lorde.

In 1986 she joined the University of Maryland, College Park, where she taught in the Harriet Tubman Department of Women's Studies until taking emerita status in 2017. She is the author of two books: the first, Theory in Its Feminist Travels: Conversations in US women's movements (Indiana University Press, 1994), analyzes feminist theory not as static concepts but rather as themselves the objects of knowledge, which are created via competing politics and through conversational exchanges. Networked Reenactments: Stories Transdisciplnary Knowledges Tell (Duke University Press, 2011) deals with television in the 1990s forward and the way the rise of the Internet obliged television series to learn to engage on other platforms and with other institutions, and in turn become defined by them, whether the European Union, museum practices, scholarly work. In a review article for Women's Studies Quarterly, Joy Fuqua wrote, "It is often the case that I read a book that inspires me to rethink a particular phenomenon. However, it is rare that a book challenges me to think differently about what it means to think. Katie King's Networked Reenactments accomplishes both things."

King is also editor of a festschrift for Donna Haraway called Party Writing for Donna Haraway!, presented as a "web-book".
