= Caren Kaplan =

- Known for: transnational feminism

Academic background
- Education: University of California, Santa Cruz
- Influences: James Clifford; Donna Haraway

Caren Kaplan is professor emerita of American Studies at University of California, Davis, and a figure in the academic discipline of women's studies. Together with Inderpal Grewal, Kaplan has worked as a founder of the field of transnational feminist cultural studies or transnational feminism.

== Career ==
Kaplan is a proponent of the digital humanities and has turned the critical lens of cultural studies upon topics such as travel, visual culture, militarization and the construction of consumer subjects. Her book Questions of Travel is about the development of a social science attentive to the role of travel and mobility in everyday life and contemporary culture. Along with figures such as Lisa Parks, Kaplan has expanded feminist studies of technology and infrastructure through her work on aerial imagery and mapping, the Global Positioning System (GPS), and the rise of drones and remote sensing technologies in warfare and policing.

Kaplan graduated from Hampshire College in 1977 with a degree in social theory and received her Ph.D. in 1987 from the History of Consciousness program at the University of California, Santa Cruz. She wrote her dissertation, The Poetics of Displacement: Exile, Immigration, and Travel in Contemporary Autobiographical Writing, under the direction of James Clifford, Donna Haraway, and Teresa de Lauretis. Before accepting her position at UC Davis, Kaplan held teaching appointments at the University of California Berkeley and Georgetown University. In 2006–2007, she won the Digital Innovation Fellowship from the American Council of Learned Societies. Kaplan was the founder of the Designated Emphasis on Women, Gender and Sexuality at University of California, Berkeley when she was a professor there and influenced scholars such as Mimi Thi Nguyen, Vernadette Vicuna Gonzalez, and Jasbir Puar. At University of California, Davis, Kaplan founded the interdisciplinary Critical Militarization, Policing, and Security Studies (CRTMIL), a working group for the study of emergent and everyday practices and technologies of state power. There she influenced scholars such as Toby Beauchamp, Liz Montegary, Abigail Boggs, Tristan Josephson, and Andrea Miller.

== Books ==
- Caren Kaplan, Aerial Aftermaths: Wartime from Above, Duke University Press, 2017.
- Lisa Parks and Caren Kaplan, Life in the Age of Drone Warfare, Duke University Press, 2017.
- Caren Kaplan, Questions of Travel: Postmodern Discourses of Displacement, Duke University Press, 1996.
- Caren Kaplan and Inderpal Grewal, An Introduction to Women's Studies: Gender in a Transnational World, McGraw-Hill Humanities/Social Sciences/Languages, September 25, 2001 (Second edition 2005)
- Caren Kaplan, Norma Alarcón and Minoo Moallem. Between Woman and Nation: Transnational Feminisms and the State, Duke University Press, 1999.
- Caren Kaplan and Inderpal Grewal, Scattered Hegemonies: Postmodernity and Transnational Feminist Practices, (University of Minnesota Press, 1994)

== Caren Kaplan multimedia projects ==
- Dead Reckoning: Aerial Perception and the Social Construction of Targets
