= Transnational feminism =

Feminist movements and ideology

Transnational feminism refers to both a contemporary feminist paradigm and the corresponding activist movement. Both the theories and activist practices are concerned with how globalization and capitalism affect people across nations, races, genders, classes, and sexualities. This movement asks to critique the ideologies of traditional white, classist, western models of feminist practices from an intersectional approach and how these connect with labor, theoretical applications, and analytical practice on a geopolitical scale.

The term "transnational" is reaction and the rejection of terms like "international" and "global" feminism. Transnational feminists believe that the term "international" puts more emphasis on nation-states as distinct entities, and that "global" speaks to liberal feminist theories on "global sisterhood" that ignore Global Majority women and women of color's perspectives on gender inequality and other problems globalization inherently brings.

The transnational feminist academic paradigm draws from postcolonial feminist theories, which emphasize how colonialist legacies have shaped and continue to shape the social, economic, and political oppression of people across the globe. It rejects the idea that people from different regions have the same subjectivities and experiences with gender inequality, it further recognizes that global capitalism has created similar relations of exploitation and inequality, this core concept creates dialogue which feminists around the world can find solidarity and seek collaboration. Transnational feminism further complicates global capitalism and neoliberalism.

Transnational feminist practice is involved in activist movements across the globe that work together to understand the role of gender, the state, race, class, and sexuality in critiquing and resisting structures of patriarchal, capitalist power. It is attentive to feminism as both a liberatory formation and a practice that has been oppressed by and sometimes been complicit with colonialism, racism, and imperialism. As such, it resists utopian ideas about "global sisterhood" while simultaneously working to lay the groundwork for more productive and equitable social relations among women across borders and cultural contexts.

== Usage ==
Transnational feminist theorists and practitioners vary in how they phrase "transnational feminism". Variations include "transnational feminisms", or "transnational feminist praxis" and "transnational practices"

Amanda Swarr and Richa Nagar, in their book Critical Transnational Feminist Praxis, give a list of the now outdated terms that describe transnational feminist practices. They emphasize that, like these "rejects", the term "transnational" feminisms is merely a product of its time in the U.S. and Canadian academic institutions. Before, the terms were " "women of color" feminisms (Combahee River Collective 1982), "third world" feminisms (Mohanty et al. 1991), "Multicultural feminisms (e.g. Shohat 1998)", "international (Enloe 1990)" and "global" feminisms (e.g., Morgan 1984)." Currently, "transnational feminism" is the term that feminists like Chandra Mohanty and Jacqui Alexander, Inderpal Grewal and Caren Kaplan claim has political power and can discard essentialist binaries like First World/Third World, or heteronormative gender constructs. These feminist theorists believed that "international" put more emphasis on nation-states as distinct entities, and that "global" speaks to liberal feminist theories, like Robin Morgan's concept of "global sisterhood", without taking into consideration race, class, culture, or colonialist and imperialist histories.

In Women's studies on its own: a next wave reader in institutional change, Inderpal Grewal and Caren Kaplan claim they do not think the term "transnational" is better than either "international" or "global", but that it is useful inasmuch as it is free from the implications that other terms may have:

Transnational as a term is useful only when it signals attention to uneven and dissimilar circuits of culture and capital. Through such critical recognition, the links among patriarchies, colonialisms, racisms, and feminisms become more apparent and available for critique or appropriation. The history of the term "international", by contrast, is quite different.

— Inderpal Grewal and Caren Kaplan,

Criticisms against the term "transnational" claim that because it de-emphasizes the borders between nations and emphasizes the similar concept of global capital flows, it deceptively smooths over large inequalities between nations.

Transnational Feminism in practice can be noted as a means of studying the "other", a western concept of people not strictly related to the global north. This is the attempt to understand what factors make up their identities and struggles and a way of acknowledging that these experiences have their own complex natures, unique geographically and how this is interpolated by those examining and theorizing.

== History ==
=== Globalization ===
Globalization is a process marked by greater political, economic, and social interdependence between all the nations of the world. It arose in the 1970s with greater market expansion.

As neoliberal ideologies and policies spread in the 1980s and 1990s, more governments started deregulating their markets. In the Third World, governments implemented Structural Adjustment Programs, which espoused the neoliberal ideologies of free trade, increased government deregulation, and reduced welfare and social protection. These practices feminized the labor force.

Because women in Third world countries are now more involved in the professional workforce, many outsource care work to women in developing countries. This provides more job opportunities for the Third World women but also detracts from the migrants' ability to care for their own children and increases the gap in human capital between the two spheres. Because of this global demand for outsourced labor, women in countries like Bangladesh and Cambodia who would otherwise not have a job now do, and studies have shown that this improves their sense of empowerment and reduces likelihood of domestic abuse.

Globalization also allows resistances against the spread of neoliberal ideologies. Transnational feminist networks, in which women from all over the world can organize together against gender inequity, would not be possible without the information and travel networks created by globalization.

=== Feminism ===
In the Oxford Handbook of Transnational Feminist Movements, Valentine Moghadam says that "women have worked together across borders since at least the mid-1800s. (55)" What is now called first wave feminism started in the early twentieth century in the West with a focus on women's suffrage. During World War II, the United States government gave women jobs because the war had caused a national shortage of labor. After the war ended, Irene Tinker says (oxford transnational), these jobs were taken away but women were no longer satisfied going back to their previous gender roles. Starting in the 1960s in the United States, second wave feminism emerged, defined by women's organization around "equal right to education, employment, and equal pay for equal work, and on sexual and reproductive rights."

The UN Decade for Women of 1976–1985, and the following four UN conferences on women between 1975 and 1995 were essential in creating transnational feminist networks and putting feminism on a global agenda. However starting in the 1980s there was a separation between Western feminists and Third World feminists. This occurred largely because Western feminists largely subscribed to liberal feminist perspectives, which focused on the common patriarchal oppressor of women, defined by its confining women to the household and traditional work. Liberal feminists propose that women break this oppression by leaving their traditional roles in the household, becoming educated, and entering the labor force. Women in developing countries often felt that Western feminism did not represent them and align with their struggles. They felt that Western feminism was ethnocentric and assumed all women had similar situations. Scholars like Chandra Talpade Mohanty plays an integral role in articulating concerns about Western feminism's failure to account for non-Western subjects. She critiques feminism during this time period to be more inclusive of intersectional struggles, identifying that feminism and inequalities are not linear, and the idea of female being a basis of shared oppression invisibilized the individual within their specific context and time. Upon realizing that the common phenomena of capitalist globalization was causing women all over the world to be disproportionately affected (CITE), transnational feminist movements allied together and helped to consolidate the field of transnational feminism.

=== Transnational feminism ===
The theory termed "transnational feminism" was first used by Inderpal Grewal and Caren Kaplan in 1994 in their germinal text Scattered Hegemonies: Postmodernity and Transnational Feminist Practices, which situated transnational feminism among other theories of feminism, modernity, and postmodernity. Soon after, M. Jacqui Alexander and Chandra Mohanty published Feminist Genealogies, Colonial Legacies, Democratic Futures in 1997, a book important in formulating transnational feminist canon. This text, building on Grewal and Kaplan's, focused more on the ways in which a new theory of transnational feminism could help foreground feminist activist practices in global contexts. They talk about "feminist democracies" as ways for activists to imagine nonhegemonic futures.

The practice of transnational feminism networks, in which feminists started exchanging ideas and collaborating across nation-state borders, originated from the United Nations conferences in the 1970s. In 1975 the United Nations Decade of Women began with the United Nations declaration of an International Women's Year. This ushered in a decade of conferences that would continue to the present. Important events during this period included conferences in Mexico City (1975), Copenhagen (1980), Nairobi (1985), and Beijing in 1995.

These conferences and others facilitated the contact of feminists from all over the globe, allowing for discussions to occur that transcended borders. While so called "western feminists", a term for feminists that were "US-based white, class-privileged women" had dominated the women's rights movement, when women from other parts of the globe were brought in, they began criticizing this type of women's rights for assuming all women had the same experiences, and not considering the impact of factors such as race, state, economic status had on their lives.

The theories of WID and GAD also helped to highlight gender related issues that pertained to women worldwide. The establishment of transnational feminist networks did many things, one such thing was creating numerous NGOs. The United Nations conferences were not the only factors leading to the transnationalization of feminism as mentioned, WID and GAD played important roles and so did other global events. As more women globally were gaining greater access to education, obtaining jobs, and becoming more mobile, it allowed for women to more easily meet and communicate. The spread of neoliberalism, poor working conditions, and declining welfare conditions in many countries led many women to find common ground and to subsequently form transnational feminist groups and organizations.

Although the term "transnational" was chosen for its supposed political power and ability to "resist or question modernity", Laura Briggs, in the Oxford Handbook of Feminist Theory, claims that "transnational feminism" could only be legitimized as a separate field of feminist study when the term "transnational" started being used by business schools, education systems, and global corporations in the 1990s. Since then, however, academic institutions have been incorporating transnational feminist studies as categories of study. In 2000, a group of feminists started publishing the journal Meridians: feminism, race, transnationalism, in which feminist theorists like Amrita Basu started using the term "transnational feminism" to describe a separate and emerging field of feminist studies.

== Theory ==
Transnational feminist theories seek to destabilize liberal feminist assumptions that Third World women face the same type of oppression as First World women. In their germinal text Scattered Hegemonies: Postmodernity and Transnational Feminist Practices, the authors Inderpal Grewal and Caren Kaplan posit transnational feminist theory as one that critiques modernity through the lens of feminist theory. This articulation of feminist theory is a revision to the field of postmodernism, which the authors argue is powerful in its critique of modern global capitalism, but inadequate because it does not explore gender or reflect on the consequences of theorizing with a Western background. Without paying attention to how colonial histories and global capital flows allow for different cultures to influence and change each other, postmodernist theorists portray non-Western cultures as essentially different from and marginal to Western cultures. Postmodern does not exemplify the realities of transnational feminism and its relation to developing countries, Mohanty states "postmodernist critique that is skeptical of a systematic analysis of institutionalized power and of decolonizing methodologies that center marginalized experience (women of color epistemology) in struggles for justice is seriously off the mark". In order for activists around the world to collaborate, they need a theory that both creates solidarity among women all over the globe and recognizes difference. This involves challenging how people from different cultures understand what being a "woman" is and can be. Grewal and Kaplan express this sentiment when they say:

In working to construct such a terrain for coalition and cooperation, however, we have to rearticulate the histories of how people in different locations and circumstances are linked by the spread of and resistance to modern capitalist social formations even as their experiences of these phenomena are not at all the same or equal.

These modern capitalist social formations can include "humanitarian" wars waged on behalf of the supposed oppressed women. Laura Bush, along with various western feminist groups such as the American National Organization for Women and the Feminist Majority Foundation, justified the war in Afghanistan because of "the human rights abuses committed against Afghani women and girls by the Taliban". Transnational feminists often oppose such wars, and tend to insist that Western states try to work with local women's rights groups, such as the Revolutionary Association of the Women of Afghanistan (RAWA). to ensure the effectiveness of solving the cultural and systematic problem that is affecting those marginalized subjects. Another example of discourse and disparities between liberal feminist and transnational theories is the ban against wearing Muslim burqas in public. Westerners objected to burqas because they saw them as "a symbol of subservience". Transnational feminists argue that banning burqas forces women to conform to "Euro-patriarchal notions of femininity and dress", stripping them of their agency to make their own choices.

== Concerns ==
There are a number of concerns that many transnational feminists focus on. Issues of gender, languages, imperialism, colonialism, economics, human rights, race, psychology, and nationalism encompass many areas of concern.

=== Gender ===
Transnational feminisms examine how powers of colonialism, modernity, postmodernity, and globalization construct gender norms, or normative conceptions of masculinity and femininity among the subaltern, Third World, and colonized.

Second-wave feminism in the 1980s started to explore gender instead of sex as a category of distinction between people. With a recognition that biology can identify differences between people, feminists focused on the system of gender norms as an ongoing, changeable process that shaped people's lives and behaviors. This production of critique was largely used in the Global North and is a liberal feminist ideology. Though it did not broaden the discussion of workplace discrimination and reproductive rights for heterosexual female identified people of the first world, this wave was exclusionary of Third world feminist and developing countries. Second wave feminism rejected critic of inequalities due to class, race, sex, socioeconomic status, legal status, age, ability and religion.

With global capitalism causing more people to migrate away from their homes in search of jobs, migration has affected genders unequally, and is thus a key concern in transnational feminisms and feminist economics. Women currently account for roughly half of long-distance migration, and overwhelmingly marginalized women of color bear the burden of global capitalism.

=== Human rights ===
Because the original design of human rights, particularly as constituted in the Universal Declaration of Human Rights, was designed to fit into specific legal categories, it reflected the "needs and values of affluent white Western men" who were the subjects of the legal system. Transnational feminists argue that human rights sometimes do not take into account other conceptions of rights, and do not recognize the experiences of women, in particular those who are "indigenous, Third World, women of color, poor, rural, disabled and queer". For example, human rights are geared towards public life and often don't account for the violations of women within their private lives. The private sector is often one of the major focuses of women's rights, including "domestic violence, the 'double day' of work and family, discrimination against homosexuals, or the denial of reproductive rights", and even rights tied to keeping these private for women. However, human rights discourse doesn't largely concern itself with these areas. Feminists also critique that these definitions of human rights are often tied too much to the nation-state itself, and that this model discludes "the majority of women and communities throughout the world".

Feminists argue that human rights tend also to reinforce power imbalances, giving marginalized people the false assumption that they have rights. In reality these kinds of rights often work more greatly in favor of those already with power, and furthermore that nation-states that already do not care to follow human rights declarations have no incentive to protect women's rights.

=== Race ===
Race is a very relevant area of study for transnational feminism as it is concerned with cross-cultural interactions, histories, and migrations. Race plays an important role in shaping not only historical interactions between groups, but also present day migrations. Race also plays an important role in many transnational interactions shaping conceptions of cultures and groups of people. Race is a key component in transnational feminism, race and ethnicity contribute to the complexities of why globalization and neoliberal agendas are imposed on certain groups (colonized; read: marginalized groups) over others (colonizer; read: imperial elitist).

=== Economics ===
Some transnational feminist groups focus on economic issues. Many of the most important issues to transnational feminists revolve around economics. For many transnational feminists like Mohanty, global capitalism is a serious problem and one that hurts women, particularly Third World women. Mohanty argues strongly against global capitalism. She considers herself an anti-capitalist and is opposed to globalization. Mohanty advocates transnational feminists take similar stances. The expansion of neoliberalism and neoliberal policies are also of concern given their often negative impacts on women. According to Audre Lorde, empowering people who are doing work, like educating others, does not mean using privilege to overstep and overpower groups like educators. Instead, these people must use their privilege to hold the door open for more allies to step in and support groups like educators or less-industrialized groups of women.

=== Colonialism ===
Colonialism is one of the most important areas of concern for transnational feminism. Inderpal Grewal and Caren Kaplan talk about how colonialism has created situations of gender inequality that continue to disadvantage the lives of women today. Sometimes this inequality takes the form of neocolonialism, which manifests in the way that First World or Western feminists talk about women from the Third World, creating a binary of Us vs. Them rather than developing a cultural understanding of the differences each respective group has. These ways of talking do not consider colonialist histories and tend to portray Third World women as isolated from flows of global capital and information, and therefore passive, helpless, and uninformed. Such Western depictions of non-Western women, Grewal and Kaplan argue, only perpetuate hierarchies that place Western theorists at the superior center and non-Western theorists and people at the inferior margins.

=== Imperialism ===
Imperialism has had numerous effects on people. Imperialism has often been the impetus for colonialism. Transnational feminism examines not only colonial history, but how imperialism may have contributed to that history. Imperialism is not an issue of only the past, but one of modern-day concern. For example, the United States occupations of Iraq and Afghanistan can be seen as imperialistic in nature. The United States has also had a substantial military presence in Pakistan. Some transnational feminists argue this kind of imperialistic nature has led to the increased fundamentalism and extremism in Pakistan, which can be seen in the Zina laws. The Zina Laws are strict religious laws that regulate extramarital and premarital sex. These laws have very negative effects on women's livelihoods. Transnational feminism looks at the reasons behind the oppression of women. Some feminists might simply look at the oppressive nature of such policies, while many transnational feminists look to how these oppressive policies came to be. By not only examining the issue at hand but depthinging the systematic ideologies such as neocolonialism and imperialism and how those contribute to the initial involvement into that country.

=== Nationalism ===
In her essay "Postcolonial Legacies", Geraldine Heng shows how feminism in almost all Third World countries arose as part of nationalistic agendas that were reacting against colonialism and imperialism. Kwame Anthony Appiah talks about how footbinding in China ended when it was seen to represent the weakness of the nation: here, Chinese nationalism enacts its hopes for an anti-imperialist future on the bodies of its women. Some transnational feminist are antagonistic to nationalism because of its history of being a tool of control "the retrospective activity of nation-building in modernity is always predicated upon women as trope".

=== The nation-state ===
Because global capitalism is one of the driving forces for much of the inequalities that transnational feminists are addressing with, and nation-states produce and reproduce structures of global capitalism, nation-states are important to look at in transnational feminist practices.

Today, there is also a wave of transnational feminism with "important currents of feminism are challenging the state-territorial framing of political claims-making" and that rejects "the state-territorial frame" itself. They point out that the actions of one state can and tend to affect the lives of women in surrounding territories, and even throughout the world with more powerful actors. Furthermore, the actions of non-state actors, especially those of international organizations, of the governmental and non-governmental varieties, have huge impacts on the lives of women without consideration of state borders. Likewise, communication at the scale it exists today can alter the lives of women, especially with "global mass media and cyber technology". Many of the issues that women around the world face as well are not simply from within state borders, such as sickness and climate change, so the traditional model of the state does not do enough for helping to solve these issues.

Some further claim that this framework of the state further contributes to oppression, as it "partitions political space in ways that block many women from challenging the forces that oppress them", especially with the protection international corporations and the current global governance of the economy. Many of the poor and marginalized in the world, especially of the women, are restricted in seeking justice for problems against such large, international corporations. It also takes many groups out of the global decision making, as, with a few exceptions, women are underrepresented at the national level in many states and in many global governance groups. These feminists argue that because women are among the most impoverished and underrepresented of the world, in the current framework of the global nation-state, it is even more difficult for women to attempt to create change, when in order to do so, they must often go against their domestic state or an international corporation, both of which have more resources and influence than a singular or even a small community of women, so this power division and systematic structure seeks to further oppress women.

=== Psychology ===
Most articles in American Psychological Association journals are about largely White, US populations, although U.S. citizens only constitute about 5% of the world's population. Arnett (2008) pointed out that psychologists have no grounds for assuming psychological processes are universal and generalizing research findings to the rest of the global population. Henrich, Heine, and Norenzayan (2010) noted that although only 1/8 of people worldwide live in regions that fall into the WEIRD (western, educated, industrialized, rich and democratic) societal classification, 60–90% of psychology studies are performed on participants from these areas. They gave examples of results that differ significantly between people from WEIRD and tribal cultures, including the Müller-Lyer illusion. Arnett (2008), Altmaier and Hall (2008), and Morgan-Consoli et al. (2018) all view the Western bias in research and theory as a serious problem considering psychologists are increasingly applying psychological principles developed in WEIRD regions in their research, clinical work, and consultation with populations around the world. Kurtis, Adams, Grabe, Else-Quest, Collins, Machizawa, and Rice have begun to articulate a transnational feminist psychology (also called transnational psychology) that applies transnational feminist lenses to the field of psychology to study, understand, and address the impact of colonization, imperialism, and globalization. In order to counter the Western bias in the field of psychology, Kurtis and Adams proposed applying the principles of transnational feminism and using a context-sensitive cultural psychology lens to reconsider, de-naturalize, and de-universalize psychological science. They identified people in the non-Western, "Majority World" (areas where the majority of the world's population lives) as valuable resources for revising traditional psychological science. Grabe and Else-Quest proposed the concept of "transnational intersectionality" that expands current conceptions of intersectionality, adding global forces to the analysis of how oppressive institutions are interconnected. In addition, Bhatia believes that a transnational cultural psychology is needed examine the psychology of diasporas, who are impacted by globalization and consequently have many "homes," languages, and selves. A 2015 Summit organized by Machizawa, Collins, and Rice further developed transnational psychology by inspiring presentations and publications that applied transnational feminist principles to psychological topics.

== Networks and organizations ==
In the Introduction for the Oxford Handbook of Transnational Feminist Movements, Rawwida Baksh and Wendy Harcourt define transnational feminist movements as "the fluid coalescence of organizations, networks, coalitions, campaigns, analysis, advocacy and actions that politicize women's rights and gender equality issues beyond the nation-state, particularly from the 1990s, when deepening globalization and new communications and information technologies (ICTs) enabled feminists to connect readily with and interrogate their localities and cross-border relations (4)." The formation of Transnational Feminist Network organizations requires methods for approaching the conflicts that arise based out of cultural and personal differences of women across the globe. Approaches include dialogue based conversations, flexibility and organization.

Sarah E. Dempsey, Patricia S. Parker & Kathleen J. Krone list a number of organizations they consider to be a Transnational Feminist Network in their article Navigating Socio-Spatial Difference, Constructing Counter-Space: Insights from Transnational Feminist Praxis:

- Association for Women's Rights in Development (AWID)
- Association of Women of the Mediterranean Region (AWMR)
- Development Alternatives with Women for a New Era (DAWN)
- Women's Environment and Development Organization (WEDO)
- Women in Development Europe (WIDE)
- Women Living Under Muslim Laws (WLUML)
- World March of Women (WMW)

Other examples of Transnational Feminist Networks include

- Women's Learning Partnership for Rights, Development, and Peace
- Women Working Worldwide
- Asia-Pacific Research and Resource Organization for Women
- Global Sisterhood Network

Transnational Feminist Organizations:

- AF3IRM

AF3IRM is the first organization to openly and purposefully put transnational feminism into practice. Since 2006, inspired by theorists like Chandra Mohanty, AF3IRM has set out to practice a feminism that builds deeply in local communities and horizontally across national borders. AF3IRM is also anti-imperialist, acknowledging and addressing the role United States imperialism and global capitalism plays in the subjugation of women worldwide.

== Movements/activism ==
Gender plays a large role in the allotment of work, quality of work, type of work etc. Women often find themselves in poor working conditions, earning minimal pay, and having little to no channels to protest or negotiate the conditions. Rural agricultural work in Brazil often exemplifies some of these conditions. Transnational feminists take interests in projects to improve gender relations in family agriculture. These feminists wanted to understand the subordination of women agricultural workers and also give the women the tools to increase political discourse. By creating political discourse they could hopefully increase their bargaining power in labor situations. Labor rights are an issue for women not only in Brazil, but all over the world. Transnational feminists in South Africa study and acknowledge the many factors affecting women. Women in South Africa face racial oppression, gender oppression, and subsequently oppression as workers.

Transnational feminists across East Asia and the United States examine intersecting forces such as race, gender, and labor that shape women’s lives. In response, the Yellow Tent feminist art project, as part of the feminist art movement, is a mobile, participatory, arts-based pedagogical transnational activism space that facilitates storytelling, dialogue, and collaborative artmaking, supporting women’s expression and transnational feminist activism.

== Critiques ==
Transnational feminism has been criticized for working within the imperialistic framework it has derived from.

A major criticism of transnational feminism lie in the duality of approach to research. While the United States has been seen as a great source for imperialist privilege, Sylvanna Falcón asserts that it is not the US alone that "practices imperial privilege".

"Privileges garnered as a result of geopolitical power are not always experienced
the same way, even by groups of people who benefit from the same structural privileges."

This speaks to the level in which "Western" feminism is still homogenized as a single experience, even from transnational feminist scholars. Falcón reminds scholars to be mindful of the social location of identities that lie within the area of Western feminism while utilizing a transnational feminist lens. Furthermore, Falcón's assessment of the transnational feminist approach to ontology challenges the "tendency to secularize US feminist research."

"Its purpose is to support a research practice that recognizes
both ontologies in order "to theorize in a respectful way.""
Many scholars ask: Who has the power of representation, whom are they speaking for/about and from what perspective? What images construct the “other” and what constructs this feminist knowledge?

== Methodology ==
One key critique to transnational feminist research and literature is the obtainment of resources to accurately represent the masses and marginalised people. Falcon suggests "building of ethics involves relationships and solidarity models, prioritizing collective justice, adopting alternative research models that acknowledge the dimensions of spirituality in relation to ethics". The need to collect other sources besides elite academic search components to ensure the accessibility of this knowledge. This also challenges academia's tendency to be exclusionary and selective to what is considered valid and noteworthy content. "Imperialist privilege is one of those contradictory factors in the research process". To bridge this gap the call for building a research community through seeking out community members, collecting testimonies to people affected by neocolonialism in marginalized communities and involving family members is crucial to creating an organic collective of non-academic, valid knowledge for transnational feminism rhetoric. The challenge Transnational Feminist researchers are faced with is the ability to incorporate ontologies that are relational Falcon, further explains

"Knowledge production is collective, and we must strive to retain that collective spirit in the organization of our research. As a result, scholars may have to be more creative about their research practices or acknowledge that we do not have the existing methodological tools or ability to research certain dimensions of relational ontologies."

This is not to discourage Transnational feminist but to further critique the modes in which research and academic literature obtains its knowledge. Acknowledging the central nature of feminist research as being imperialist is crucial to understanding how to further improve feminist scholarship.

== See also ==
- Chandra Talpade Mohanty
- Colonialism
- Diaspora
- Feminism
- Feminism and Nationalism in the Third World
- Fundamentalism
- Gender inequality
- Global feminism
- Globalization
- Gypsy feminism
- Human rights
- Migration
- Modernism
- Modernity
- Nationalism
- Postcolonial feminism
- Postcolonialism
- Postmodernism
- Smadar Lavie
- Transnational psychology
