= Charles Skoller =

American lawyer

Charles Skoller (July 26, 1932 - February 17, 2012) was an American prosecutor and author. He was an assistant district attorney for Queens County, New York City and while in that position prosecuted Winston Moseley, the murderer in the infamous Kitty Genovese case. Later after his retirement he wrote a book about that and another noted case he prosecuted in a volume entitled "Twisted Confessions: The True Story Behind the Kitty Genovese and Barbara Kralik Murder Trials". Skoller died in Boca Raton, Florida on February 17, 2012, at the age of 79.
