= Harold Takooshian =

American academic and psychologist (born 1949)

- Education: City University of New York
- Occupations: psychologist, scholar, professor
- Employer: Fordham University
- Known for: bystander effect studies

Harold Takooshian (born 1949) is an American psychologist, scholar, and professor at Fordham University. He is best known as an expert on the Kitty Genovese murder case, having spent many years studying the subject and the role that the "bystander effect" played therein.

== Early life and education ==
Takooshian graduated from City University of New York (CUNY) in 1979 with a PhD. At CUNY, Takooshian was a student of the famed social psychologist Stanley Milgram known for his controversial experiments on obedience.

== Career ==
He has been a member of the Fordham University faculty since 1975. Takooshian is a widely published essayist having written articles for periodicals including; the Journal of Social Distress and the Homeless, International Psychology Bulletin and The Counseling Psychologist, among many other publications.

Takooshian is currently a professor of psychology and of Urban Studies at Fordham University. He is a past President of Psi Chi the worlds' largest psychology honors society and was the 2009-10 recipient of the organization's Florence L. Denmark Faculty Advisor Award. He is also a former president and the current secretary of the Manhattan Psychological Association.

Takooshian has hosted a number of symposiums on the Genovese case, including; "Remembering Catherine "Kitty" Genovese: A public forum" to mark the fortieth anniversary of the event. Among the participants on the panel were the New York Times executive editor and columnist A.M. Rosenthal (1922–2006), who was so moved by the case that he went on to write "Thirty-Eight Witnesses: The Kitty Genovese Case", which brought worldwide attention to the incident, Charles Skoller, the prosecutor of the crime and author of "Twisted Confessions: The True Story Behind the Kitty Genovese and Barbara Kralik Murder Trials", and several other experts in fields germane to the story.

He has also written at length on subjects relating to his own Armenian heritage, Armenia, and Armenian Americans.

In 1987-88 he was a Fulbright scholar to the USSR and then In 2013-14 he was the recipient of a second Fulbright Scholarship, this time to lecture in the since his prior visit reconstituted nation of Russia under the aegis a project entitled "Social Psychology of City Life Across Cultures". Subsequent to this second scholarly visit the article "On the Russian-American Cooperation in Social Psychology (Professor H. Takooshian's Visit to Russia in September–December 2013)'", co-authored by Takooshian and Alexander Voronov was published by the Moscow State University of Psychology and Education.

Takooshian also contributed several entries in Kenneth T. Jackson's The Encyclopedia of New York City published by Yale University Press. Among his most recent publications is the article "Internationalizing Undergraduate Psychology Education: Trends, Techniques, and Technologies" in American Psychologist co-authored with Scott Plous, Grant J. Rich and Uwe P. Gielen. He is often consulted by media sources on a variety of other current subjects; including in different instances; Donald Trump and political correctness, the Brian Williams embellishment of the truth uproar and the United States Federal sentencing of Abu Hamza al-Masri.

== Acting and film ==
In the 2015 film Experimenter, starring Peter Sarsgaard as Stanley Milgram. Takooshian acted as a science advisor to the feature's director, Michael Almereyda, as well as performing on screen in a small role as a "familiar stranger".

Takooshian also appeared with Daniel Bruhl, in the TNT series The Alienist adapted from the novel by Caleb Carr of the same name, in the "Alienst: The Birth of Psychology" a historical short produced by the cable channel to accompany the feature program.
