= Institute for International and Cross-Cultural Psychology =

US research institute

The Institute for International and Cross-Cultural Psychology (IICCP) at St. Francis College, New York City was founded in 1998. During its 21 years of existence it has become known for the advancement of cross-cultural psychology and international psychology. Supported by an International Advisory Board of psychologists from six countries, members of the institute have engaged in a series of research projects, edited books on a broad variety of topics in international psychology, sponsored numerous conferences, symposia and colloquia, given lectures at many conferences and institutions around the world, and introduced innovative curriculum development.

== Objectives ==
The institute's objectives are: (1) to sponsor research and publications in international and cross-cultural psychology; (2) to help internationalize the teaching of psychology; (3) to create a network of ties with other interested psychological institutions in the US and abroad; (4) to promote cross-cultural awareness at Saint Francis College by developing courses, workshops, symposia, and conferences; (5) to involve students in cross-cultural research; and (6) to foster a sense of appreciation of the cultural richness in the St. Francis College community.

== Activities ==
Each year the International Psychology Division (52) of the American Psychological Association offers the Ursula Gielen Global Psychology Book Award, with IICCP members playing an important role in selecting the award winner. The award is presented to the author(s) or editor(s) of a recent book that makes the greatest contribution to psychology as an international discipline and profession, or more specifically, the degree to which the book adds to our understanding of global phenomena and problems from a psychological point of view.

The Director of the institute, Uwe P. Gielen, received his Ph.D. in social psychology from Harvard University. His work has centered on cross-cultural psychology and international psychology, moral development in diverse cultures, Chinese American youths' and young adults' development, and Tibetan studies. He is a former president of the International Council of Psychologists (ICP), the Society for Cross-Cultural Research (SCCR), and the American Psychological Association's International Psychology Division, and has given some 350 presentations in 34 countries.

The institute's Director for Student Affairs, Renée Goodstein, received her Ph.D. from Fordham University. She practices psychotherapy with a specialization in multiculturalism and is actively involved in efforts to reduce intergroup tensions and prejudice.

The institute's Director for Research Projects, Sunghun Kim, received his Ph.D. from The University of Texas-Austin. He is a specialist in cross-cultural psychology and in methodology.

== Research and publications ==
Ongoing research and book projects at the institute include the following: Growing up Chinese in New York City; Asian Families in North America; and Immigrants from around the World.

The institute has sponsored the editing and writing of 23 volumes and more than 90 articles on cross-cultural and international topics during the last 18 years. Between 1998 and 2003 the Institute supported the editing of the International Journal of Group Tensions, a journal sponsored by the International Society for the Study of Group Tensions.

The DVD: International Psychology: Perspectives and Profiles (Judy Kuriansky, Teacher's College Columbia University and Uwe P. Gielen), which is supported by the International Division of the American Psychological Association, introduces students and others to the field of international psychology. It includes interviews with prominent international psychologists and interested students. The DVD is available free of charge from IICCP.

Scientific books published by members of the Institute for International and Cross-Cultural Psychology include the following:

- Adler, L. L., & Gielen, U. P. (Eds.). (1994/2001). Cross-cultural topics in psychology (2nd ed.). Westport, CT: Praeger.
- Adler, L. L., & Gielen, U. P. (Eds.). (2003). Migration: Immigration and emigration in international perspective. Westport, CT: Praeger.
- Ahmed, R. A., & Gielen, U. P. (Eds.). (1998). Psychology in the Arab countries. Menoufia, Egypt: Menoufia University Press. (Received Al-Ahram Prize for Distinguished Books 1999–2000, Cairo, Egypt.)
- Ahmed, R. A., & Gielen, U.P. (Eds.). (2006). Psychology in the Arab countries. (rev. edition, in Arabic). Cairo, Egypt: The Supreme Culture Council of Egypt (Vol. 1054).
- Brown, C. M., Gielen, U. P., Gibbons, J. L., & Kuriansky, J. (Eds.). (2017). Women's evolving lives: Global and psychosocial perspectives. Cham, Switzerland: Springer International.
- Comunian, A. L., & Gielen, U. P. (Eds.). (2000). International perspectives on human development. Lengerich, Germany: Pabst Science Publishers.
- Comunian, A. L., & Gielen, U. P. (Eds.). (2002). It’s all about relationships. Lengerich, Germany: Pabst Science Publishers.
- Denmark, F. L., Krauss, H., Wesner, R., Midlarsky, E., & Gielen, U. P. (Eds.). (2005). Violence in schools: Cross-national and cross-cultural perspectives. New York: Kluwer.
- Gielen, U. P., Cohen, M. T., & Michalski, M. (2012). St. Francis College graduate school and career handbook (4th ed.). New York: St. Francis College.
- Gielen, U. P., & Comunian, A. L. (Eds.). (1998). The family and family therapy in international perspective. Trieste, Italy: Lint.
- Gielen, U. P., & Comunian, A. L. (Eds.). (1999). International approaches to the family and family therapy. Padua, Italy: UNIPRESS.
- Gielen, U. P., Draguns, J. G., & Fish, J. (Eds.). (2008). Principles of multicultural counseling and therapy. New York: Routledge.
- Gielen, U. P., Fish, J., & Draguns, J. G. (Eds.). (2004). Handbook of culture, therapy, and healing. Mahwah, NJ: Erlbaum.
- Gielen, U. P., & Kim, S. (Eds.). (in press). Global changes in children's lives. Oxford, UK: Oxford University Press.
- Gielen, U. P., & Roopnarine, J. L. (Eds.). (2016). Childhood and adolescence: Cross-cultural perspectives and applications (2nd ed.). Santa Barbara, CA: Praeger.
- Moodley, R., Gielen, U. P., & Wu, R. (Eds.). (2013). Handbook of multicultural counseling and psychotherapy in an international context. New York: Routledge.
- Rich, G., & Gielen, U. P. (Eds.). (2015). Pathfinders in international psychology. Charlotte, NC: Information Age Publishing.
- Rich, G. J., Gielen, U. P., & Takooshian, H. (Eds.). (2017). Internationalizing the teaching of psychology. Charlotte, NC: Information Age Publishing.
- Roopnarine, J. L., & Gielen, U. P. (Eds.). (2005). Families in global perspective. Boston: Allyn & Bacon.
- Sharma, D. (2011). Barack Obama in Hawai'i and Indonesia: The making of a global president. Santa Barbara, CA: Praeger.
- Sharma, D., & Gielen, U. P. (2014). The global Obama: Crossroads of leadership in the 21st century. New York: Routledge.
- Stevens, M. J., & Gielen, U. P. (Eds.). (2007). Toward a global psychology: Theory, research, intervention, and pedagogy. Mahwah, NJ: Erlbaum.
- Takooshian, H., Gielen, U. P., Denmark, F. L., & O'Roark, A. M. (Eds.). (2018). Visions and resources for global psychology. New York: Global Scholarly Publications.
