= Teresa de Lauretis =

Italian academic (1938–2026)

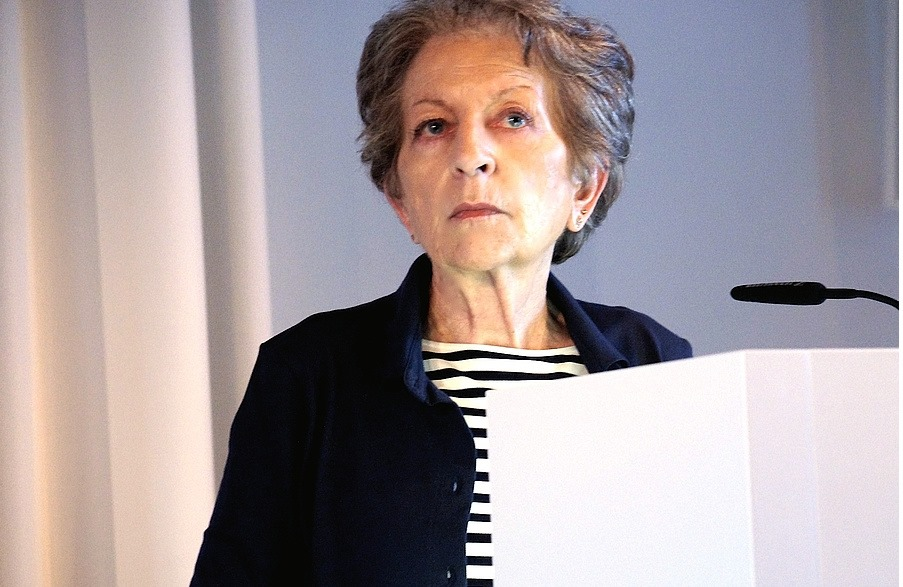
- Born: 29 November 1938; Bologna, Kingdom of Italy
- Died: 2 February 2026 (aged 87); San Francisco, California, USA
- Occupation: Professor Emerita of the History of Consciousness
- Known for: coined the term "queer theory"

Academic background
- Education: Bocconi University

Teresa de Lauretis (Italian: [teˈrɛːza de lauˈrɛːtis]; 29 November 1938 – 2 February 2026) was an Italian author and academic who was a Distinguished Professor Emerita of the History of Consciousness at the University of California, Santa Cruz. Her areas of interest included semiotics, psychoanalysis, film theory, literary theory, feminism, women's studies, lesbian and queer studies. She also wrote on science fiction. Fluent in English and Italian, she wrote in both languages. Additionally, her work has been translated into 16 other languages.

== Background ==
De Lauretis was born in Bologna on 29 November 1938. She received her doctorate in Modern Languages and Literatures from Bocconi University in Milan before coming to the United States. She joined the History of Consciousness program with Hayden White, Donna Haraway, Fredric Jameson and Angela Davis. She held visiting professorships at universities worldwide including ones in Canada, Germany, Italy, Sweden, Austria, Argentina, Chile, France, Spain, Hungary, Croatia, Mexico and the Netherlands.

She lived in San Francisco, California, but often spent time in Italy and the Netherlands. De Lauretis died in San Francisco, at the age of 87; the date of her death is reported variously as 2 February or 3 February 2026.

== Work ==
De Lauretis's account of subjectivity as a product of "being subject/ed to semiosis" (i.e., making meanings and being made by them) helps to theoretically resolve and overcome the tension between human action (agency) and structure. She made use of Umberto Eco's reading of Charles Sanders Peirce to establish her notion of the semiotics of experience. She brought corporeality back to the discourse on the constitution of subjectivity, which has been conceived mainly in linguistic terms. Her semiotics is not just the semiotics of language but also the semiotics of visual images and non-verbal practices. Her (Peircean) "habit" or "habit-change" is often compared to Bourdieu's notion of habitus.

Michel Foucault's analysis of the body excludes the consideration of the specificity of the female body that many feminists have criticized. Supplementing the failure, gender should be one of the effects of technology, which renders the basic intelligibility of the body, and that turns to De Lauretis's "technology of gender". De Lauretis coined the term "queer theory" although how it is used today differs from what she originally suggested by the term. She coined the term in February 1990 at a conference at the University of California, Santa Cruz, whose proceedings were collected in a 1991 special issue of Differences: A Journal of Feminist Cultural Studies. De Lauretis discussed the main ideas of queer theory in the issue, making an impact on the field of queer studies. She suggested that queer studies should be studied separately from lesbian and gay studies. De Lauretis stated that "queer theory challenged norms" that enforce inequalities regarding "social identities" such as gender, sexuality, class, and race. Although she coined the term she abandoned it barely three years later because it had been taken over by those mainstream forces and institutions it was coined to resist.

== Honours, awards and grants ==
- Guest of honour, Universidad Nacional del Litoral, Argentina (2014)
- Doctor honoris causa, Universidad Nacional de Córdoba, Argentina (2014)
- Distinguished Career Award, Society for Cinema and Media Studies (2010)
- Winner, Choice Magazine Outstanding Reference/Academic Book Award (2009)
- IHR Humanities Research Fellowship (2007)
- Doctor of Philosophy honoris causa, University of Lund, Sweden (2005)
- UCHRI Resident Faculty Fellowship, University of California, Irvine (2003-2004)
- Guggenheim Fellowship (1993)
- NEH Fellowship for University Teachers (1992)
- Conference Grant, Humanities Division, University of California, Santa Cruz (1990)
- Conference Grant, Research Council of Canada (1884)
- Research Fellowship, Center for Twentieth Century Studies, University of Wisconsin—Milwaukee (1982–83)
- Grant in Media Studies, National Endowment for the Arts (1977–78)

== Bibliography ==
Books (English)

- Freud's Drive: Psychoanalysis, Literature, and Film (2008)
- Figures of Resistance: Essays in Feminist Theory (2007)
- The Practice of Love: Lesbian Sexuality and Perverse Desire (1994)
- Technologies of Gender: Essays on Theory, Film, and Fiction (1987)
- Feminist Studies/Critical Studies (1986)
- Alice Doesn't: Feminism, Semiotics, Cinema (1984)
- The Cinematic Apparatus (1980)
- The Technological Imagination (1980)

Anthologies or collections she edited or co-edited

- Feminist Studies/Critical Studies (1986)
- The Cinematic Apparatus (1980)
- The Technological Imagination (1980)

Journals

- Guest-edited "Queer Theory" issue of differences: A Journal of Feminist Cultural Studies (1991)
- (with David Allen) "Theoretical Perspectives in Cinema" issue of Ciné-Tracts: A Journal of Film and Cultural Studies (1977).

Books (Italian)

- La sintassi del desiderio: struttura e forme del romanzo sveviano (Ravenna: Longo, 1976)
- Umberto Eco (Firenze: La Nuova Italia, 1981)
- Sui generis (Milano: Feltrinelli, 1996)
- Pratica d'amore : percorsi del desiderio perverso (Milano: Tartaruga, 1997)
- Soggetti eccentrici (Milano: Feltrinelli, 1999)
