= Noelani Goodyear-Kaʻōpua =

Kanaka Maoli scholar of Hawaiian social movements

- Born: Kalihi, Hawaii, US

Academic background
- Education: University of Hawaiʻi at Mānoa; University of California, Santa Cruz

Academic work
- Discipline: political science
- Institutions: University of Hawaiʻi at Mānoa
- Main interests: Native Hawaiian social movements

Noelani Goodyear-Kaʻōpua is a Kanaka Maoli scholar and educator whose work centers on Native Hawaiian social movements, culture-based education, and energy and food politics.

She has published several books concerning the Hawaiian sovereignty movement and Native Hawaiian education initiatives. She is also a co-founder of Hālau Kū Māna, a Hawaiian culture-based charter school, which opened in Honolulu in 2001. Since 2007, she has taught at the University of Hawaiʻi at Mānoa as an associate professor of Political Science and the Vice Chancellor of Academic Personnel.

== Birth ==
Goodyear-Ka'ōpua was born on the island of O'ahu, Hawaii, in the 1970s. Her parents were student activists engaged in the growing Native Hawaiian land rights movement at the University of Hawaiʻi at Mānoa. She has ancestry in the Maui Islands as well as Southern China and the British Midlands.

== Education ==
Goodyear-Ka'ōpua attended the University of Hawaiʻi at Mānoa, in the mid-1990s, where she was a student of Haunani-Kay Trask. She graduated magna cum laude from the university in 1996 with a Bachelor of Arts degree in Hawaiian studies and political science.

In 2005 she received her Ph.D. in history of consciousness at the University of California, Santa Cruz.

== Professional activities ==
Goodyear-Ka'ōpua worked as an instructor at the Center for Hawaiian Studies at the University of Hawaiʻi at Mānoa from 1997 to 1998 and then again from 2002 to 2005. In 2002, she became an instructor at the College Opportunities Program at the same university. Since 2007 she has taught at the University of Hawaiʻi at Mānoa, as an associate professor of Political Science.

In 1999 Goodyear-Ka'ōpua co-founded the Hālau Kū Māna Public Charter School in Honolulu, Hawai'i. The school was created with the mission to become a center for Native Hawaiian cultural revitalization and community empowerment. Hālau Kū Māna opened in 2001 and remains one of the few Hawaiian culture-based charter schools in Honolulu.

Goodyear-Ka'ōpua gave a talk at TEDxMānoa titled "The Enduring Power of Aloha Āina" on 5 October 2012.

== Community service ==
Goodyear-Ka'opua founded and served as Board President of Mana Maoli, a non-profit organization supporting Native Hawaiian community-based education, from 1999 to 2008. She served on the board and grant-making committee for the Hawai'i People's Fund from 2005 to 2010.

Goodyear-Kā'opua has served as a board member for Hui o Kuapā, a non-profit founded in 1989 to support Native Hawaiian fishpond restoration, education, and research, since 2015. She also currently serves on the board for the Kānehūnāmoku Voyaging Academy and the advisory board for the Hawai'i Center for Food Safety.

Since 2014 Goodyear-Ka'opua has served as the lead curriculum developer and facilitator of a series of community organizers' trainings called Movement-Building for Ea.

She currently serves as Professional Secretary and Executive Board Member of the Native American and Indigenous Studies Association.

== Publications ==
=== Books ===
Goodyear-Ka'opua is the author of The Seeds We Planted: Portraits of a Native Hawaiian Charter School, published in 2013. The book examines the history of the Hālau Kū Māna Charter Public School in Honolulu and outlines the challenges of implementing traditional Hawaiian culture-based education under the context of U.S. occupation. The book covers the U.S. charter school movement and the struggle for Hawaiian self-determination under settler-colonialism.

Goodyear-Ka'opua is also the co-editor (with Aiko Yamashiro) of The Value of Hawai'i 2: Ancestral Roots, Oceanic Visions, and A Nation Rising: Hawaiian Movements for Life, Land, and Sovereignty (with Ikaika Hussey and Erin Kahunawaika'ala Wright), both published in 2014. Both books cover topics on the Hawaiian sovereignty movement, public health, environmental policy and Indigenous food justice activism, education, art, and Indigenous futurity.

Goodyear-Ka'opua is the co-author of Militarism and Nuclear Testing in Oceania, a Teaching Oceania textbook, published in 2016.

In 2019, Goodyear-Ka'opua published Nā Wāhine Koa: Hawaiian Women for Sovereignty and Demilitarization, a collaboration with four activist elders who helped catalyze Hawaiian movements of the late 20th century.

Her current work is an upcoming intellectual biography on Dr. Haunani-Kay Trask.

=== Articles in referenced journals ===
- Goodyear-Ka'ōpua, N. "Protectors of the Future, not Protestors of the Past." South Atlantic Quarterly, 116, no. 1 (2017): 184-194.
- Ka'ōpua, L.S., Goodyear-Ka'ōpua J.N., Ka'awa, J., Amona, S.K., Browne, C.V., & Robles, A.S. "Look to the Source: Gathering Elder Stories as Segue to Youth Action-Oriented Research." International Public Health Journal, 8, no.2 (2016), 271-281.
- Goodyear-Ka'ōpua, N. & Baker, M. "The Great Shift: Moving Beyond a Fossil Fuel-based Economy." Hūlili journal: Multidisciplinary Research on Hawaiian Well-Being, 8 (2012): 133-166.
- Goodyear-Ka'ōpua, N. "Kuleana lāhui: Collective responsibility for Hawaiian nationhood in activists' praxis." Affinities: A Journal of Radical Theory, Culture, and Action, 5, Special issue on Anarch@Indigenism (2011): 130-163.
- Goodyear-Ka'ōpua, N. "Rebuilding the 'Auwai: Connecting ecology, economy and education in Hawaiian schools." AlterNative: An International Journal of Indigenous Peoples, 5, no. 2 (2009): 46-77.
- Goodyear-Ka'ōpua, N., Kauai, W., Maioho, K., & Winchester, I. "Teaching Amid Occupation: Sovereignty, Survival and Social Studies at a Native Hawaiian Charter School." Hūlili Journal: Multdisciplinary Research on Hawaiian Well-Being, 5 (2008): 155-201.
- Goodyear-Ka'ōpua, N. & Ka'ōpua, L. "Dialoging Across the Pacific: Kūkākúkā and the Cultivation of Wahine Maoli Identity." Pacific Studies, 29, no. 3/4 (2007): 48-63.

=== Book reviews ===
- Goodyear-Ka'opua, N. "Defining indigeneity; possessing land," a review of Hawaiian Blood: Colonialism and the Politics of Sovereignty and Indigeneity by Kehaulani Kauanui. In Asia Pacific Viewpoint, 51, no. 1 (2010): 113-114.

== Fellowships ==
- Mellon-Hawai'i Postdoctoral Fellowship. Sept 2010-June 2011.
- Ford Foundation Postdoctoral Fellowship. 2010-2011.
- First Nations Futures Program Fellowship. Awarded 2008.
- Laco'o award for outstanding Hawaiian dissertation. Awarded by the Native Hawaiian Education Association. March 2008.
- Ford Foundation Predoctoral Fellow 1999.
