= Inderpal Grewal =

- Known for: transnational feminism
- Scientific career
- Fields: Cultural theory Gender studies Feminism
- Workplaces: Yale University; University of California, Irvine; San Francisco State University

Inderpal Grewal is a professor of Women's, Gender and Sexuality Studies at Yale University. Her research interests include transnational and postcolonial feminist theory; feminism and human rights; nongovernmental organizations and theories of civil society and citizenship; law and subjectivity; travel and mobility and South Asian cultural studies. Together with Caren Kaplan, Grewal is best known for her work as a founder of the field of transnational feminist cultural studies or transnational feminism. She has served on the Editorial and Advisory Boards of core journals in the field of feminist cultural studies, Women's Studies Quarterly; Jouvert: Journal of Postcolonial Studies and Meridians: feminisms, race, transnationalism. She is also one of three series editors for the New Wave in Women's Studies book series published by Duke University Press and blogs about gender issues for the Huffington Post.

Before her appointment at Yale, she taught at the University of California, Irvine and at San Francisco State University.

Grewal has a Ph.D. in English from the University of California, Berkeley and an M.A. from Punjab University.

== Recent publications ==
Inderpal Grewal, 'Saving the Security State: Exceptional Citizens in Twenty-First Century America,' Duke University Press, 2017

- Inderpal Grewal, Transnational America: Feminisms, Diasporas, Neoliberalisms. Durham: Duke University Press, 2005
- Caren Kaplan and Inderpal Grewal, An Introduction to Women's Studies: Gender in a Transnational World, McGraw-Hill Humanities/Social Sciences/Languages, September 25, 2001 (Second edition 2005)
- Inderpal Grewal, Home and Harem: Nation, Gender, Empire and the Culture of Travel. Durham: Duke University Press, 1997)
- Caren Kaplan and Inderpal Grewal, Scattered Hegemonies: Postmodernity and Transnational Feminist Practices, (Univ of Minnesota Press, 1994)

== Videos of Inderpal Grewal ==
- 2007 Keynote address at the Duke Feminist Theory Workshop
- Inderpal Grewal on a feminist panel on transnational feminism and terrorism
- Inderpal Grewal on a panel: "Liberalism and its others"
- 2011 Lecture at UCLA
- Soli Sorabjee Lecture in South Asian Studies at Brandeis University in 2013
