= Connie Samaras =

American photographer

- Born: Albuquerque, New Mexico
- Education: Eastern Michigan University
- Known for: photography, video art
- Website: Official website

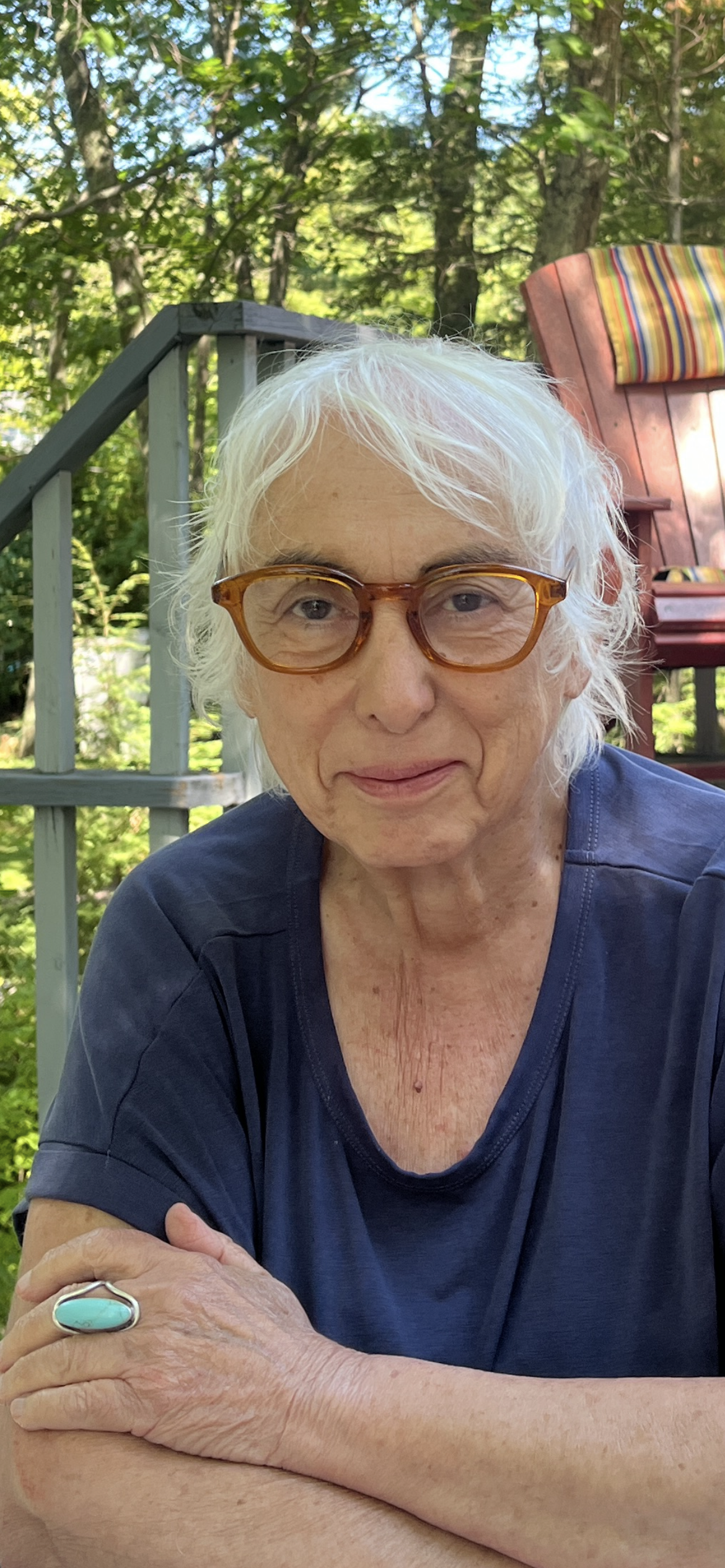
Photo of Connie Samaras in Georgian Bay

Connie Samaras is a Los Angeles-based artist who works mostly in photography and video. She is best known for her speculative landscape series.

== Early life and education ==
Samaras was born in Albuquerque, New Mexico, in the early 1950s. She received her M.F.A. degree from Eastern Michigan University.

== Career ==
Connie Samaras' artistic career as a photographer and videographer has focused on feminism (specifically second wave), culture, technology, sexuality and gender studies, science, and both human-made and natural environments. She is a full professor at the University of California, Irvine.

Samaras has showed her works in museums and galleries across the globe in both solo exhibitions and group shows. Some of her most notable shows include the California Museum of Photography (2011), the New Mexico Museum of Art (2001), Tauranga Museum (2009), the Japanese National American Museum (2008), and the Tijuana V International Biennial of Standards (2008). Her large-scale photographs of Las Vegas were included in the 2001 book Benjamin's Blind Spot.

After the American Century was a photographic project that revolved around the city of Dubai and its vast city construction projects. The work as a whole examines the politics and economics of such extreme constructed environments. Samaras explores the idea of Dubai being a city that is of the future, yet placed in the Arabian desert, an area with a long history. The photos of stark buildings almost entirely devoid of life give the photographs a dysotopian science-fictional feel.

V.A.L.I.S (Vast Active Living Intelligence System) was a photographic project that Samaras worked on through a National Science Foundation's Artists and Writers grant that took her to Antarctica for parts of two years between 2005 and 2007. The premise of Samaras's project was to document the extreme environment and how it affected the surrounding architecture as time passed. In these photos one sees how the ice and harsh environment repeatedly consume the human-made structures in the area, forcing people . to constantly rebuild as buildings made decades ago become buried under layers of snow and ice. Samaras's works from Antarctica reflect a deadpan approach that avoids prompting emotional responses in the viewers.

Angelic States Even Sequences was a photographic project that focused on various cities across the United States, especially on urban forms of surveillance and technological presence.

== Major works ==
- Spaceport America (archival inkjet prints, 2010)
- After the American Century (archival inkjet prints, 2009)
- V.A.L.I.S (archival inkjet prints, 2005–2007)
- Angelic States - Event Sequence (archival inkjet prints, 1998–2003)
- Surface Events (archival inkjet prints, 1990–present)
- Dark Side of the Moon (archival inkjet prints, 2003–2005)
- Dreaming of the Millennium (photographs and text, 1999–2000)
- A Partial Correction ...Voyager Space Probes (C-prints and inkjets, 1994)
- Paranoid Delusions (ink, mylar, black and white photos, 1986–1989)
- Autoworld (standard video production still, 1989)

== Publications ==
- "American Dreams", The Scholar and the Feminist Online: Gender on Ice (2008)
- "Dream, September 10, 2001", X-TRA: Travel Issue (2002)
- "Entries and Exits", Terminals: The Cultural Production of Death (1999)
- "Abduction, a wretch like me", Whitewalls: A Journal of Language Art (1994)
- "Look Who's Talking", Artforum (1991)

== Awards and grants ==
Connie Samaras has received many prestigious awards and grants throughout her career. These include the Andy Warhol Foundation Grant (2011), the National Science Foundation Artist and Writers grant, a Creative Capital Visual Arts Award, the Getty's Mid-Career Visual Arts Fellowship (2006), Anonymous was a Woman (2003), COLA Mid-Career Artistic Fellowship (2003), Banff Centre for the Arts Senior Artist Award (2000) and New Media Institute Residency (1999), and the National Endowment for the Arts Special Exhibitions Grant (1994).
