= Elizabeth Altmaier =

Academic counseling psychologist

Elizabeth Altimaier
- Occupation: Professor Emeritus
- Awards: APA Award for Distinguished Contributions to Education and Training in Psychology (1994); Dorothy Booz Black Award (2003)

Academic background
- Education: Wheaton College; Ohio State University
- Website: http://elizabethaltmaier.com/

Elizabeth Mitchell Altmaier (born 1952) is a counseling psychologist whose clinical and academic work has focused on issues related to overcoming life-threatening and traumatic circumstances. Altmaier is professor emeritus at the University of Iowa.

Altmaier is a Fellow of the Society of Counseling Psychology, American Psychological Association (APA) Division 17. She served as chair of the APA Council on Accreditation and was a member of the APA Commission for the Recognition of Specialties and Proficiencies in Professional Psychology. She served as editor of APA’s Clinician's Research Digest and as associate editor of The Counseling Psychologist, Journal of Counseling Psychology, and Contemporary Psychology.

== Biography ==
Altmaier was born in New York City in 1952. She earned her B.A. degree from Wheaton College in Psychology in 1973. She continued her education at Ohio State University, graduating with a Ph.D. in Counseling Psychology in 1977.

Altmaier taught in the Psychology Department at the University of Florida from 1977 to 1980, before moving to the University of Iowa. She taught in the Counseling Psychology program at University of Iowa from 1980 until her retirement in 2015.

At the University of Iowa and on N.C.A.A. commissions, Altmaier served as a faculty athletics representative, assisting college athletes in addressing concerns about inadequate compensation and supporting their case to loosen rules to allow monetary payments for the use of their images in college and N.C.A.A. publicity materials. Altmaier strongly endorsed the position that Division 1 college athletes should receive more than scholarships for their "work" on behalf of N.C.A.A. sports.

Altmaier is a licensed psychologist in the state of Iowa and served as chair of the Iowa Psychological Association’s Ethics Board.

== Research ==
Altamier clinical and professional work explores how personal resources, coping style, and personality influence an individual's response to difficult circumstances. Much of her work has focused on helping individuals cope with chronic pain and cancer, bereavement, and life-changing trauma, including childhood sexual abuse. Altmaier has contributed to applied education and training efforts in various areas of counseling and health psychology. Altmaier and her colleagues conducted research on self-efficacy among patients who have chronic lower back pain. Other research focused on spiritual growth and well-being among cancer patients, and the role of social support in helping patients recover after a bone marrow transplant. Her work on the coping and anxiety management strategies of cancer patients receiving chemotherapy was funded by National Institutes of Health.

Altmaier's research was deeply influenced by her own life difficulties, which developed as a consequence of the trauma of being abused as a child. As an adult, she found treatment to help her cope with the pain. While finding meaning in her own transformation, she became very passionate about the potential of interpersonal collaboration in promoting growth after trauma.

== Awards ==
Altmaier received the 1994 APA Award for Distinguished Contributions to Education and Training in Psychology for "her commitment and dedication to ensuring quality education and training programs in professional psychology." Other awards include the 2003 Dorothy Booz Black Award for Outstanding Achievement in Health Psychology (APA, Division 17) and the 2005 Michael J. Brody Award, given by the Faculty Senate at the University of Iowa in acknowledgment of her contributions and service to the university.

== Books ==
- Altmaier, E. M. (Ed.). (2003). Setting standards in graduate education: Psychology's commitment to excellence in accreditation. American Psychological Association.
- Altmaier, E. M. (Ed.). (2016). Reconstructing meaning after trauma: Theory, research, and practice. Academic Press.
- Altmaier, E. M. (2017). Push Back the Dark: Companioning Adult Survivors of Childhood Sexual Abuse. Wipf and Stock Publishers.
- Altmaier, E. M. (Ed.). (2020). Navigating Life Transitions for Meaning. Academic Press.
- Altmaier, E. M., & Hansen, J. I. C. (Eds.). (2012). The Oxford handbook of counseling psychology. Oxford University Press.
- Hall, J. &. Altmaier, E. M. (Eds.) (2008). Global promise: Quality assurance and accountability in professional psychology. Oxford University Press.
- Ross, R. R., & Altmaier, E. M. (1994). Intervention in occupational stress: A handbook of counselling for stress at work. Sage.
