= Feminist movements and ideologies =

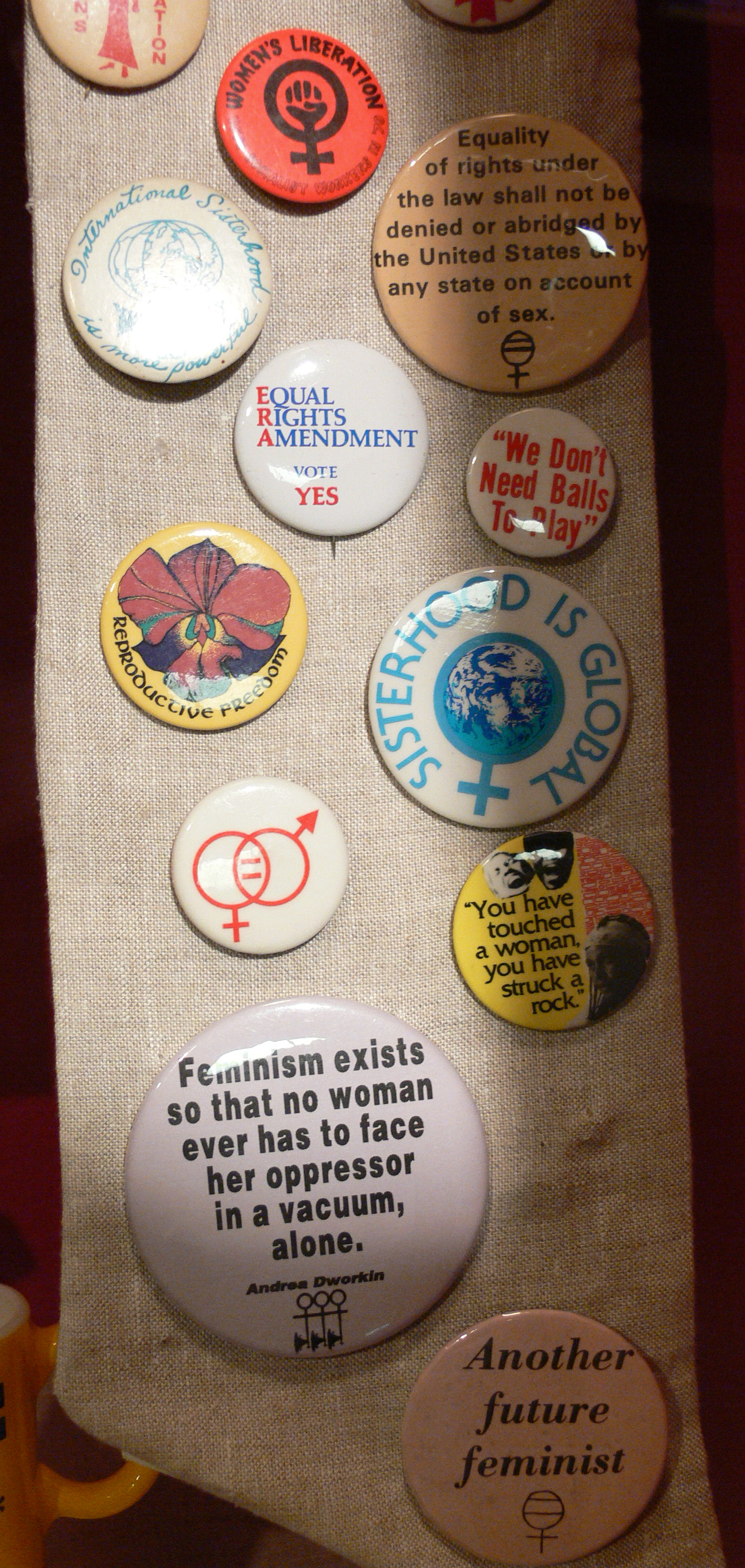
This collection of feminist buttons from a women's museum shows some messages from feminist movements.

A variety of movements of feminist ideology have developed over the years. They vary in goals, strategies, and affiliations. They often overlap, and some feminists identify themselves with several branches of feminist thought.

== Groupings ==
Traditionally feminism is often divided into three main traditions, sometimes known as the "Big Three" schools of feminist thought: liberal/mainstream feminism, radical feminism and socialist or Marxist feminism. Since the late 20th century, a variety of newer forms of feminisms have also emerged, many of which are viewed as branches of the three main traditions. Many of these forms of feminism have developed due to intersectionality. Women regardless of race have faced challenges, but more often than not women of color have faced greater challenges because of their intersectionality. The article "Intersectional power struggles in feminist movements: An analysis of resistance and counter-resistance to intersectionality" by Mariana Munoz-Puig describes intersectionality as important because in order to create a movement based on solidarity, it is necessary to include other women's issues and experiences to create true solidarity amongst all groups. Despite the aim for inclusivity the group who often leads the feminist movement are white, middle-class, cisgender, heterosexual, and able-bodied women which leaves out other women who may not fall into any of these categories and their goals for the movements. Although simply discussing the different identities of women is not enough as women view their intersectionality separately, so it is important for feminist to engage in thoughtful discussions to engage intersectionality into their movement.

Judith Lorber separates three main categories of feminist discourses: gender revolution, gender resistance, and gender reform feminisms. According to her typology, liberalism—a political philosophy that strongly emphasizes individual rights—is the foundation of gender reform feminisms. Gender-resistant feminisms concentrate on particular actions and group dynamics that maintain women's subordination even within subcultures that profess to be pro-equality. Gender revolution feminisms aim to upend the social order by dissecting its categories and concepts and examining how inequality is reproduced in culture.

== Movements and ideologies ==
=== Mainstream feminism ===
"Mainstream feminism" as a general term identifies feminist ideologies and movements which do not fall into either the socialist or radical feminist camps. The mainstream feminist movement traditionally focused on political and legal reform, and has its roots in first-wave liberal feminism of the 19th and early-20th centuries. Liberal feminism in this broad traditional sense is also called "mainstream feminism", "reformist feminism", "egalitarian feminism" or historically "bourgeois feminism", and is one of the "Big Three" schools of feminist thought alongside socialist and radical feminism.

In the context of third-wave and fourth-wave feminism, the term is today often used by essayists and cultural analysts in reference to a movement made palatable to a general audience. Mainstream feminism is often derisively referred to as "white feminism", a term implying that mainstream feminists do not fight for intersectionality with race, class, and sexuality.

Some parts of third-wave and fourth-wave mainstream feminism has also been accused of being commercialized, and of focusing exclusively on issues that are less contentious in the western world today, such as women's political participation or female education access. Radical feminists sometimes criticize mainstream feminists for not articulating the depth to which the state is part of "a system of patriarchy". Nevertheless, some argue that major milestones of the feminist struggle—such as the right to vote and the right to education—came about mainly as a result of the work of the mainstream feminist movement, which emphasized building far-reaching support for feminist causes among both men and women.

=== Liberal ===
Liberal feminism asserts the equality of men and women through political and legal reform. Traditionally, during the 19th and early 20th century, liberal feminism had the same meaning as "bourgeois feminism" or "mainstream feminism", and its broadest sense, the term liberal feminism overlaps strongly with mainstream feminism. Liberal feminists sought to abolish political, legal and other forms of discrimination against women to allow them the same opportunities as men since their autonomy has deficits. Discriminations of gender, either in the workplace or in the home, and the patriarchal mentality in inherited traditions constitutes some cause for the liberals women's movement. Liberal feminists sought to alter the structure of society to ensure the equal treatment of women. The first and the second feminist waves were led by liberal feminists and they managed to formally and legally obtain many of equal right for women, including the right to vote, right to be educated, as well as the elimination of many other patriarchal paternalistic and moralistic laws.

One of the earliest well-known liberal feminist, who had a huge influence with her writings was Mary Wollstonecraft. In her book 'A Vindication of the Rights of Woman", she encouraged women to use their voices in making their own decisions and ignore the choices which previously others had made for them.

Liberal feminism includes many, often diverging branches. Individualist feminism or libertarian feminism emphasises women's ability to show and maintain their equality through their own actions and choices and uses the personal interactions between men and women as the place from which to transform society. This use of the term differs from liberal feminism in the historical sense, which emphasized political and legal reforms and held that women's own actions and choices alone were not sufficient to bring about gender equality. For example, "libertarian feminism does not require social measures to reduce material inequality; in fact, it opposes such measures ... in contrast, liberal feminism may support such requirements and egalitarian versions of feminism insist on them."

Issues important to modern liberal feminists include reproductive and abortion rights, sexual harassment, voting, education, "equal pay for equal work", affordable childcare, affordable health care, elimination of prejudices and stereotypes and bringing to light the frequency of sexual and domestic violence against women.

=== Libertarian ===
According to the Stanford Encyclopedia of Philosophy, "Classical liberal or libertarian feminism conceives of freedom as freedom from coercive interference. It holds that women, as well as men, have a right to such freedom due to their status as self-owners." There are several categories under the theory of libertarian feminism, or kinds of feminism that are linked to libertarian ideologies. Anarcha-feminism combines feminist and anarchist beliefs, embodying classical libertarianism rather than contemporary minarchist libertarianism. Wendy McElroy has defined a position, which she labels "ifeminism" or "individualist feminism", that combines feminism with anarcho-capitalism or contemporary minarchist libertarianism, and she argued that a pro-capitalist and anti-state position is compatible with an emphasis on equal rights and empowerment for women. Individualist anarchist-feminism has grown from the United States-based individualist anarchism movement.

Individualist feminism is typically defined as a feminism in opposition to what writers such as Wendy McElroy and Christina Hoff Sommers term political or gender feminism. However, there are some differences within the discussion of individualist feminism. While some individualist feminists like McElroy oppose government interference into the choices women make with their bodies because such interference creates a coercive hierarchy (such as patriarchy), other feminists such as Christina Hoff Sommers hold that the political role of feminism is simply to ensure that everyone's, including women's right against coercive interference is respected. Sommers is described as a "socially conservative equity feminist" by the Stanford Encyclopedia of Philosophy. Some critics have called her an anti-feminist.

=== Multiracial ===
Multiracial feminism (also known as "women of color" feminism) offers a standpoint theory and analysis of the lives and experiences of women of color. The theory emerged in the 1990s and was developed by Dr. Maxine Baca Zinn, a Chicana feminist, and Dr. Bonnie Thornton Dill, a sociology expert on African American women and family.

Though often ignored in the history of the second wave of feminism, multiracial feminists were organizing at the same time as white feminists. Not only did they work alongside other women of color and white feminists, but multiracial feminists also organized themselves outside of women only spaces. In the 1970s women of color worked mainly on three fronts, "working with white dominated feminist groups; forming women's caucuses in existing mixed-gender organizations; and forming autonomous Black, Latina, Native American, and Asian feminist organizations" The perspective of Multiracial Feminism attempts to go beyond a mere recognition of diversity and difference among women, to examine structures of domination, specifically the importance of race in understanding the social construction of gender.

=== Post-structural ===
Post-structural feminism, also referred to as French feminism, uses the insights of various epistemological movements, including psychoanalysis, linguistics, political theory (Marxist and post-Marxist theory), race theory, literary theory, and other intellectual currents for feminist concerns. Many post-structural feminists maintain that difference is one of the most powerful tools that women possess in their struggle with patriarchal domination, and that to equate the feminist movement only with equality is to deny women a plethora of options because equality is still defined from the masculine or patriarchal perspective.

=== Postcolonial ===
Postcolonial feminism, sometimes also known as Third World feminism, partly draws on postcolonialism, which discusses experiences endured during colonialism, including "migration, slavery, suppression, resistance, representation, difference, race, gender, place and responses to the influential discourses of imperial Europe." Postcolonial feminism centers on racism, ethnic issues, and the long-lasting economic, political, and cultural effects of colonialism, inextricably bound up with the unique gendered realities of non-White non-Western women. It sees the parallels between recently decolonized nations and the state of women within patriarchy—both postcolonialism and postcolonial feminism take the "perspective of a socially marginalized subgroup in their relationship to the dominant culture".

Western feminists universalize women's issues, thereby excluding social classes and ethnic identities, reinforcing homophobia, and ignoring the activity and voices of non-White non-Western women, as under one application of Orientalism. Some postcolonial feminists criticize radical and liberal feminism and some, such as Chandra Talpade Mohanty, are critical of Western feminism for being ethnocentric. Black feminists, such as Angela Davis and Alice Walker, share this view. Another critic of Western perspectives is Sarojini Sahoo. Postcolonial feminists can be described as feminists who have reacted against both universalizing tendencies in Western feminist thought and a lack of attention to gender issues in mainstream postcolonial thought. Through this enterprise, postcolonial feminists spotlight how globalized ideologies that promise women's "emancipation" through universal standards may themselves produce false dichotomies between women's self-realization and local cultural practices.

Colonialism has a gendered history. Colonial powers often imposed Western norms on colonized regions, as seen by the prevalence of imperial feminist attitudes and ideology among colonial powers. Postcolonial feminists argue that cultures impacted by colonialism are often vastly different and should be treated as such. In the 1940s and '50s, after the formation of the United Nations, former colonies were monitored by the West for what was considered "social progress". Since then, the status of women in the developing world has been monitored by organizations such as the United Nations. Traditional practices and roles taken up by women—sometimes seen as distasteful by Western standards—could be considered a form of rebellion against colonial oppression. That oppression may result in the glorification of pre-colonial culture, which, in cultures with traditions of power stratification along gender lines, could mean the acceptance of, or refusal to deal with, issues of gender inequality. Postcolonial feminists today struggle to fight gender oppression within their own cultural models of society rather than through those imposed by the Western colonizers.

Postcolonial feminism is closely related to transnational feminism and to the phenomenon of imperial feminism. The former has strong overlaps and ties with Black feminism because both respond to racism and seek recognition by men in their own cultures and by Western feminists.

=== Postmodern ===
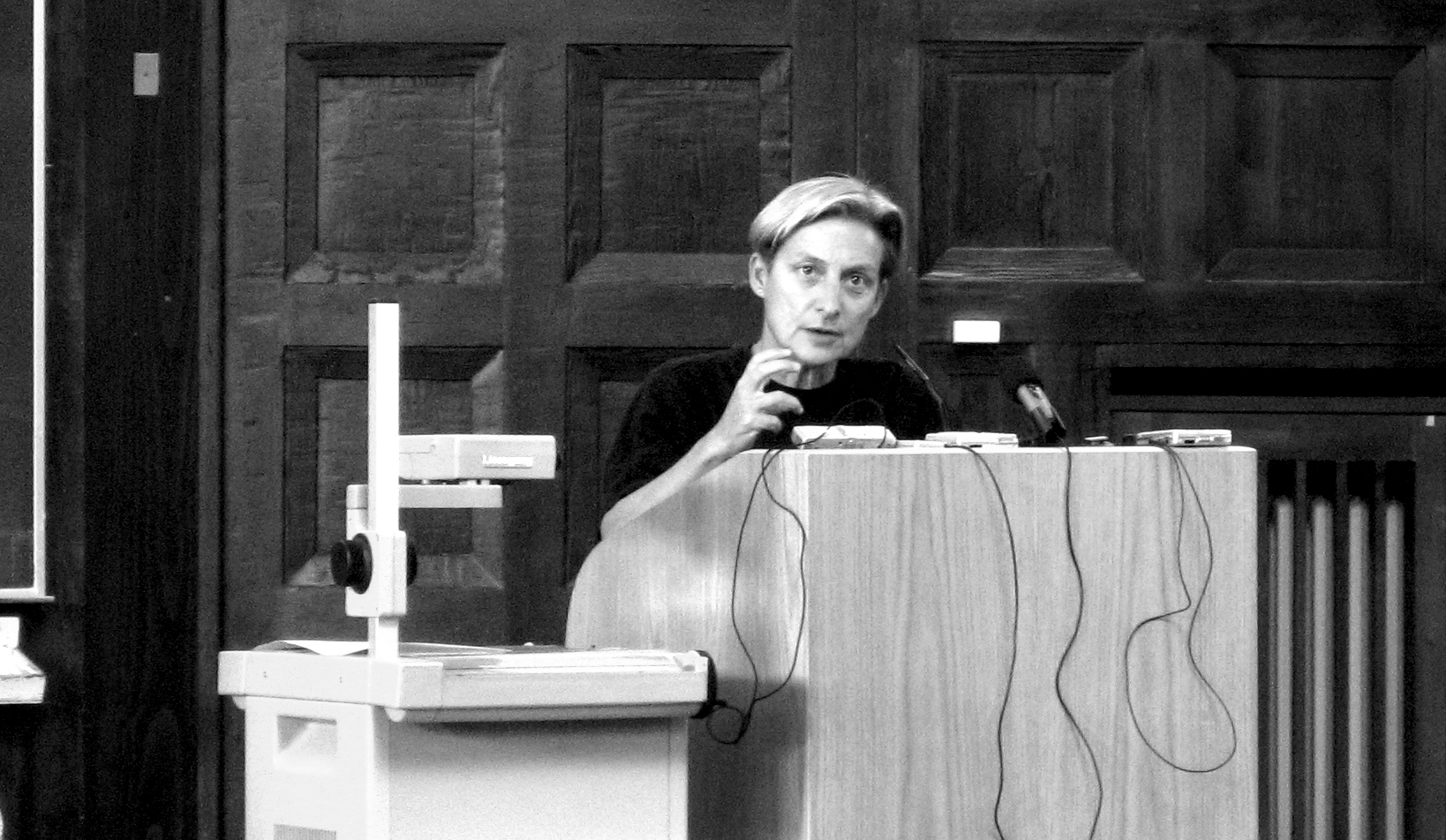
Judith Butler at a lecture at the University of Hamburg.

Postmodern feminism is an approach to feminist theory that incorporates postmodern and post-structuralist theory. Judith Butler argues that sex, not just gender, is constructed through language. In their 1990 book, Gender Trouble, they draw on and critique the work of Simone de Beauvoir, Michel Foucault, and Jacques Lacan. Butler criticizes the distinction drawn by previous feminisms between biological sex and socially constructed gender. They say that the sex/gender distinction does not allow for a sufficient criticism of essentialism. For Butler, "woman" is a debatable category, complicated by class, ethnicity, sexuality, and other facets of identity. They state that gender is performative. This argument leads to the conclusion that there is no single cause for women's subordination and no single approach towards dealing with the issue.

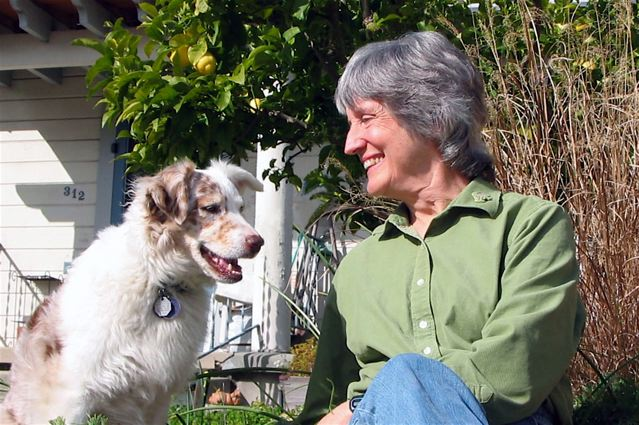
Donna Haraway, author of A Cyborg Manifesto, with her dog Cayenne.

In A Cyborg Manifesto, Donna Haraway criticizes traditional notions of feminism, particularly its emphasis on identity, rather than affinity. She uses the metaphor of a cyborg in order to construct a postmodern feminism that moves beyond dualisms and the limitations of traditional gender, feminism, and politics. Haraway's cyborg is an attempt to break away from Oedipal narratives and Christian origin myths like Genesis. She writes, "The cyborg does not dream of community on the model of the organic family, this time without the oedipal project. The cyborg would not recognize the Garden of Eden; it is not made of mud and cannot dream of returning to dust."

A major branch in postmodern feminist thought has emerged from contemporary psychoanalytic French feminism. Other postmodern feminist works highlight stereotypical gender roles, only to portray them as parodies of the original beliefs. The history of feminism is not important in these writings—only what is going to be done about it. The history is dismissed and used to depict how ridiculous past beliefs were. Modern feminist theory has been extensively criticized as being predominantly, though not exclusively, associated with Western middle class academia. Mary Joe Frug, a postmodernist feminist, criticized mainstream feminism as being too narrowly focused and inattentive to related issues of race and class.

=== Radical ===
Radical feminists tend to be more militant in their approach when compared to other feminist movements and ideologies. It considers the male-controlled capitalist hierarchy, which it describes as sexist, as the defining feature of women's oppression. Radical feminists believe that women can free themselves only when they have done away with what they consider an inherently oppressive and dominating patriarchal system. They feel that this male-based authority and power structure and that it is responsible for oppression and inequality, and that, as long as the system and its values are in place, society will not be able to be reformed in any significant way. Radical feminists see no alternatives other than the total uprooting and reconstruction of society in order to achieve their goals.

Over time a number of sub-types of radical feminism have emerged, such as cultural feminism. Other forms rooted in, but not exclusively, radical in nature include separatist feminism and anti-pornography feminism (and opposed by sex-positive feminism).

=== Separatist ===
Separatist feminism is a form of radical feminism that does not support heterosexual relationships. Separatist feminism's proponents argue that the sexual disparities between men and women are unresolvable. Separatist feminists generally do not feel that men can make positive contributions to the feminist movement and that even well-intentioned men replicate patriarchal dynamics. Author Marilyn Frye describes separatist feminism as "separation of various sorts or modes from men and from institutions, relationships, roles and activities that are male-defined, male-dominated, and operating for the benefit of males and the maintenance of male privilege—this separation being initiated or maintained, at will, by women".

=== Socialist and Marxist ===
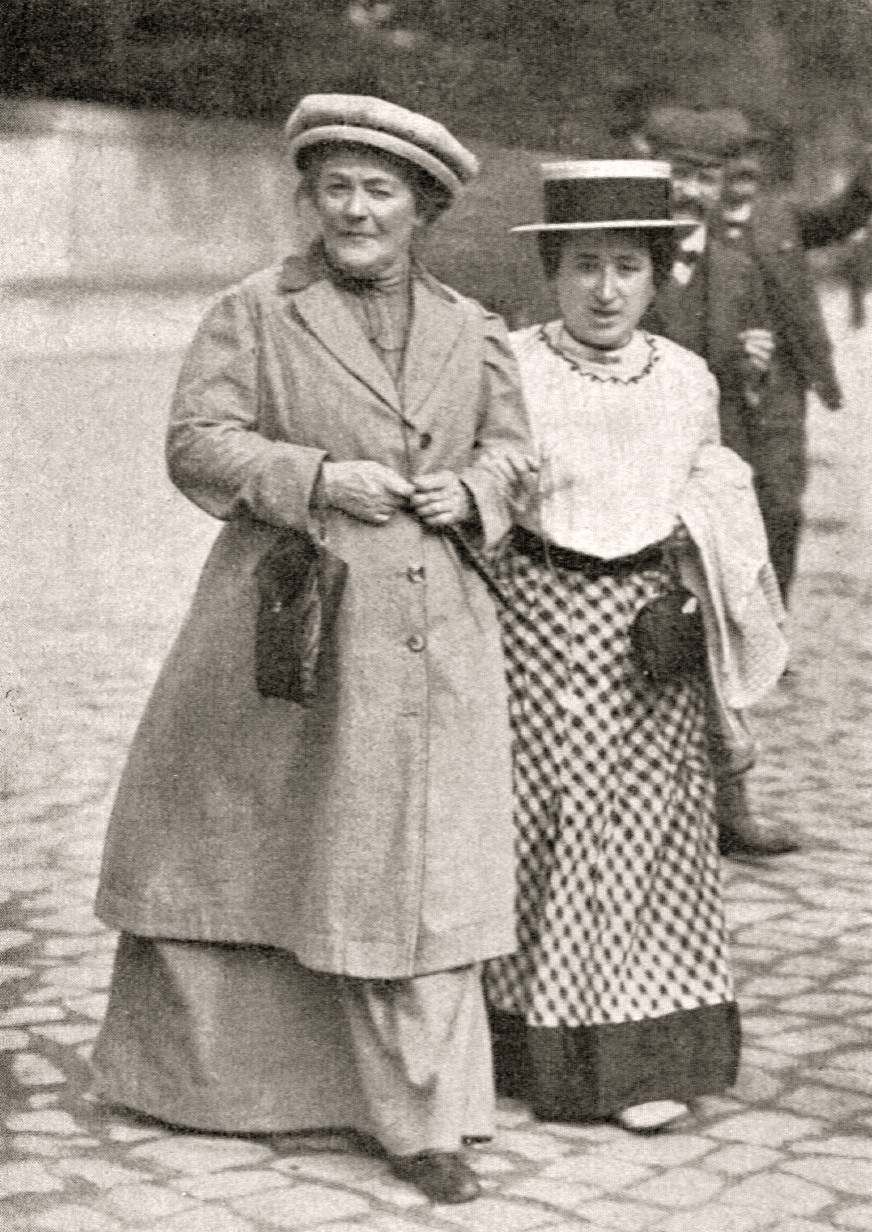
Clara Zetkin and Rosa Luxemburg, 1910.

Socialist feminism connects the oppression of women to Marxist ideas about exploitation, oppression and labor. Socialist feminists think unequal standing in both the workplace and the domestic sphere holds women down. Socialist feminists see prostitution, domestic work, childcare, and marriage as ways in which women are exploited by a patriarchal system that devalues women and the substantial work they do. Socialist feminists focus their energies on far-reaching change that affects society as a whole, rather than on an individual basis. They see the need to work alongside not just men but all other groups, as they see the oppression of women as a part of a larger pattern that affects everyone involved in the capitalist system.

Although Marx may have prioritised class oppression as the subject of his study and did not talk about female emancipation often, he did treat it as an issue in its own right. One place that this is shown is in his third Parisian manuscript of 1844, where he states that "marriage is a form of exclusive private property", and condones treating women "as the prey and servant of social lust". Despite some claims, he has never been found to argue that the creation of a classless society would lead to gender oppression vanishing; instead evidence exists which suggest that he viewed female struggles as something independent. However due to his writing on women being scarce, the tradition and works of Marxist Feminism is one constructed through the works of the many feminist Marxist's that came after; either through reinterpreting his original writings or providing their own theories to the foundation he provided. Some socialist feminists, many of the Radical Women and the Freedom Socialist Party, point to the classic Marxist writings of Frederick Engels and August Bebel as a powerful explanation of the link between gender oppression and class exploitation. To some other socialist feminists, this view of gender oppression is naive and much of the work of socialist feminists has gone towards separating gender phenomena from class phenomena. Some contributors to socialist feminism have criticized these traditional Marxist ideas for being largely silent on gender oppression except to subsume it underneath broader class oppression.

In the late nineteenth century and early twentieth century, both Clara Zetkin and Eleanor Marx were against the demonization of men and supported a proletarian revolution that would overcome as many male–female inequalities as possible. As their movement already had the most radical demands of women's equality, most Marxist leaders, including Clara Zetkin and Alexandra Kollontai counterposed Marxism against feminism, rather than trying to combine them.

=== Anarchist ===
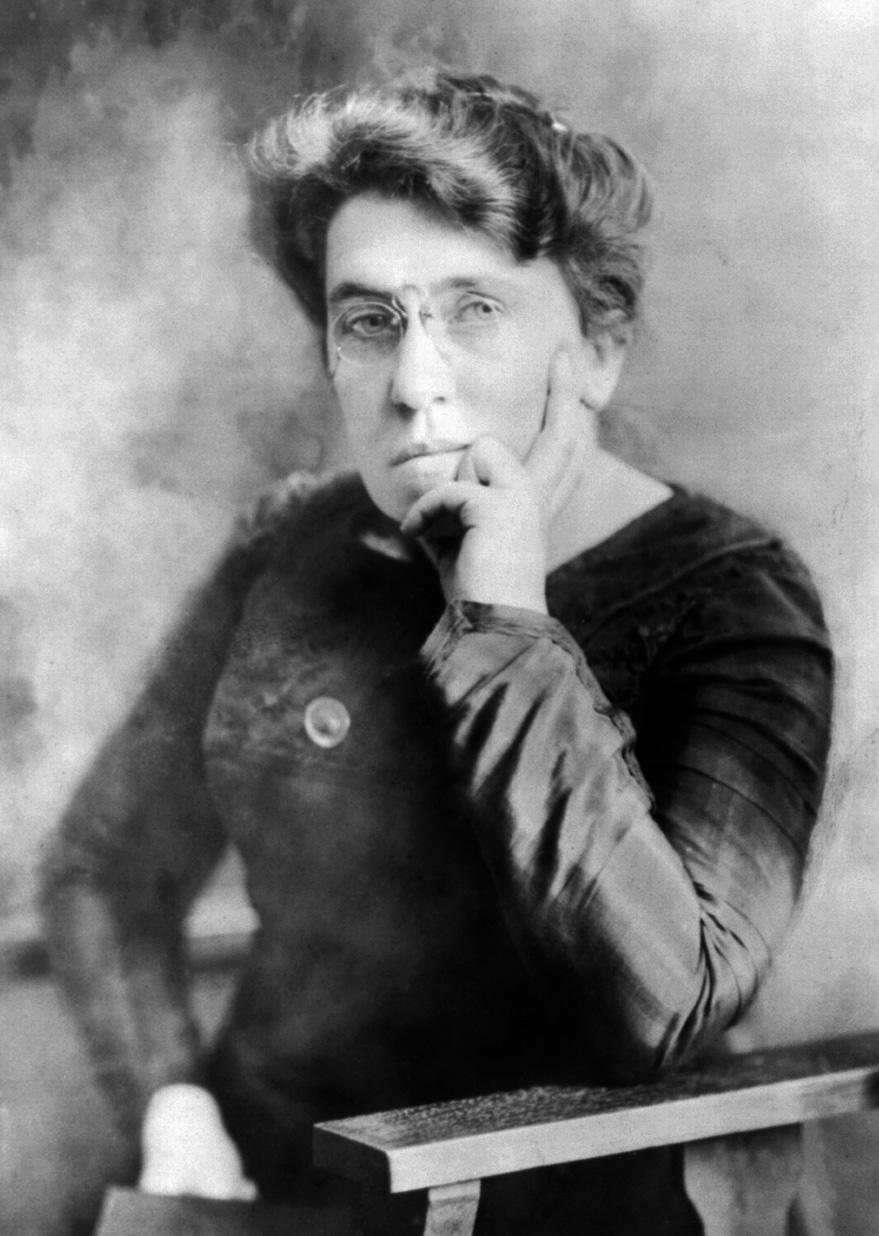
Emma Goldman, pioneer anarcha-feminist author and activist.

Anarcha-feminism (also called anarchist feminism and anarcho-feminism) combines anarchism with feminism. It generally views patriarchy as a manifestation of involuntary hierarchy. Anarcha-feminists believe that the struggle against patriarchy is an essential part of class struggle and of the anarchist struggle against the state. In essence, the philosophy sees anarchist struggle as a necessary component of feminist struggle and vice versa. As L. Susan Brown puts it, "as anarchism is a political philosophy that opposes all relationships of power, it is inherently feminist".

Important historic anarcha-feminists include Emma Goldman, Federica Montseny, Voltairine de Cleyre, Maria Lacerda de Moura, and Lucy Parsons. In the Spanish Civil War, an anarcha-feminist group, Mujeres Libres ("Free Women"), linked to the Federación Anarquista Ibérica, organized to defend both anarchist and feminist ideas.

Contemporary anarcha-feminist writers/theorists include Lucy Friedland, L. Susan Brown, and the eco-feminist Starhawk. Contemporary anarcha-feminist groups include Bolivia's Mujeres Creando, Radical Cheerleaders, the Spanish anarcha-feminist squat La Eskalera Karakola, and the annual La Rivolta! conference in Boston.

=== Black and womanist ===
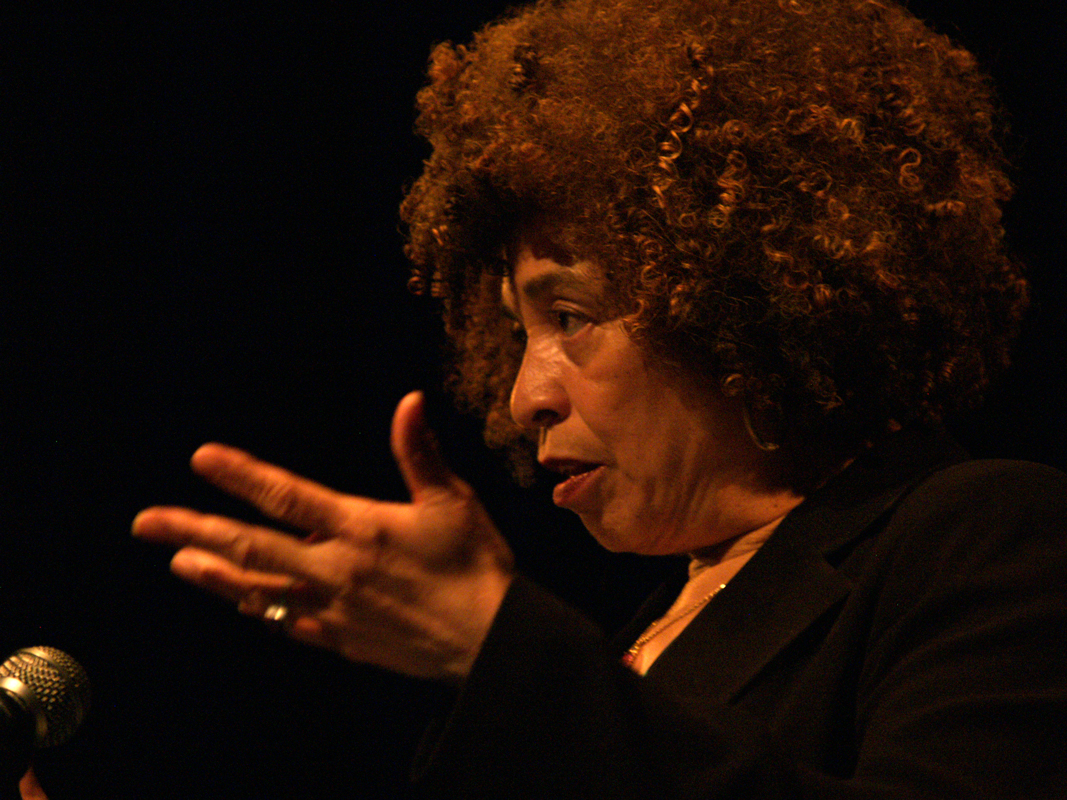
Angela Davis speaking at the University of Alberta on 28 March 2006

Black feminism argues that sexism, class oppression, and racism are inextricably bound together. Forms of feminism that strive to overcome sexism and class oppression but ignore race can discriminate against many people, including women, through racial bias. The National Black Feminist Organization (NBFO) was founded in 1973 by Florynce Kennedy, Margaret Sloan, and Doris Wright, and according to Wright it, "more than any other organization in the century launched a frontal assault on sexism and racism". The NBFO also helped inspire the founding of the Boston-based organization the Combahee River Collective in 1974 which not only led the way for crucial antiracist activism in Boston through the decade, but also provided a blueprint for Black feminism that still stands a quarter of a century later. Combahee member Barbara Smith's definition of feminism that still remains a model today states that, "feminism is the political theory and practice to free all women: women of color, working-class women, poor women, physically challenged women, lesbians, old women, as well as white economically privileged heterosexual women. Anything less than this is not feminism, but merely female self-aggrandizement." The Combahee River Collective argued in 1974 that the liberation of black women entails freedom for all people, since it would require the end of racism, sexism, and class oppression. One of the theories that evolved out of this movement was Alice Walker's womanism. It emerged after the early feminist movements that were led specifically by white women, were largely white middle-class movements, and had generally ignored oppression based on racism and classism. Alice Walker and other womanists pointed out that black women experienced a different and more intense kind of oppression from that of white women.

Angela Davis was one of the first people who articulated an argument centered around the intersection of race, gender, and class in her book, Women, Race and Class (1981). Kimberlé Crenshaw, a prominent feminist law theorist, gave the idea the name intersectionality in the late 1980s as part of her work in anti-discrimination law, as part of describing the effects of compound discrimination against black women.

A related form of feminism is African feminism.

Along with this idea of intersectionality, Black Feminist Thought as discussed by Patricia Hill Collins provides additional conceptualization of how Black Feminism can be identified. Collins (1991) offers the perspective that women of color are likely to be faced with the matrix of domination. While all members of a given society are likely to face their own unique set of standpoint and experiences, Black women in particular, will be faced with a unique construct of these identities often in the form of oppression.

=== Cultural ===
Cultural feminism is the ideology of a "female nature" or "female essence" that attempts to revalidate what they consider undervalued female attributes. It emphasizes the difference between women and men but considers that difference to be psychological, and to be culturally constructed rather than biologically innate. Its critics assert that, because it is based on an essentialist view of the differences between women and men and advocates independence and institution building, it has led feminists to retreat from politics to "life-style". One such critic, Alice Echols (a feminist historian and cultural theorist), credits Redstockings member Brooke Williams with introducing the term cultural feminism in 1975 to describe the depoliticisation of radical feminism.

=== Difference ===
Difference feminism was developed by feminists in the 1980s, in part as a reaction to "equality feminism". Although difference feminism still aimed for equality, it emphasized the differences between men and women and argued that identicality or sameness are not necessary in order for men and women, and masculine and feminine values, to be treated equally. Some strains of difference feminism, for example Mary Daly's, argue not just that women and men were different, and had different values or different ways of knowing, but that women and their values were superior to men's.

=== Ecofeminism ===
Ecofeminism links ecology with feminism. Ecofeminists see the domination of women as stemming from the same ideologies that bring about the domination of the environment. Western patriarchal systems, where men own and control the land, are seen as responsible for the oppression of women and destruction of the natural environment. Ecofeminists argue that the men in power control the land, and therefore are able to exploit it for their own profit and success. In this situation, ecofeminists consider women to be exploited by men in power for their own profit, success, and pleasure. Thus ecofeminists argue that women and the environment are both exploited as passive pawns in the race to domination. Ecofeminists argue that those people in power are able to take advantage of them distinctly because they are seen as passive and rather helpless.

Ecofeminism connects the exploitation and domination of women with that of the environment. As a way of repairing social and ecological injustices, ecofeminists feel that women must work towards creating a healthy environment and ending the destruction of the lands that most women rely on to provide for their families.

Ecofeminism argues that there is a connection between women and nature that comes from their shared history of oppression by a patriarchal Western society. Vandana Shiva claims that women have a special connection to the environment through their daily interactions with it that has been ignored. She says that "women in subsistence economies, producing and reproducing wealth in partnership with nature, have been experts in their own right of holistic and ecological knowledge of nature's processes. But these alternative modes of knowing, which are oriented to the social benefits and sustenance needs are not recognized by the capitalist reductionist paradigm, because it fails to perceive the interconnectedness of nature, or the connection of women's lives, work and knowledge with the creation of wealth."

However, feminist and social ecologist Janet Biehl has criticized ecofeminism for focusing too much on a mystical connection between women and nature and not enough on the actual conditions of women.

=== French ===
French feminism is a branch of feminist thought from a group of feminists in France from the 1970s to the 1990s. It is distinguished from Anglophone feminism by an approach which is more philosophical and literary. Its writings tend to be effusive and metaphorical, being less concerned with political doctrine and generally focused on theories of "the body". The term includes writers who are not French, but who have worked substantially in France and the French tradition, such as Julia Kristeva and Bracha Ettinger.

In the 1970s, French feminists approached feminism with the concept of Écriture féminine, which translates as 'feminine writing'. Hélène Cixous argues that writing and philosophy are phallocentric and along with other French feminists such as Luce Irigaray emphasizes "writing from the body" as a subversive exercise. The work of the feminist psychoanalyst and philosopher, Julia Kristeva, has influenced feminist theory in general and feminist literary criticism in particular. From the 1980s onwards, the work of artist and psychoanalyst Bracha Ettinger has influenced literary criticism, art history, and film theory. Bracha Ettinger conceived of a feminine-maternal dimension she has named the matrixial, and she works toward changing the definition of the human subject to include it, as well as on the "matrixial" space, object and gaze (in art) and on the importance of the matrixial feminine dimension for the fields of psychoanalysis and ethics. However, as the scholar Elizabeth Wright pointed out, "none of these French feminists align themselves with the feminist movement as it appeared in the Anglophone world."

=== Mexican ===
Possibilities for gender equality have increased due to political and cultural movements of the 20th century, which can be referred to as the "women's century" because of the successes from women's political activism in this time period. The dramatic shift in Mexican women's roles was seen in multiple sectors which included education, labor, political, and cultural, all caused by the feminist movement. Feminism in Mexico first began with the formation of the first liberal feminist association at the Normal de Profesoras in 1904, although women began fighting earlier the school featured the first generation of feminist women, writers, and teachers (Jimenez, 2012.) Feminism later made waves in the late 20th century around 1988 in Mexico City. Courses at universities such as Universidad Nacional Autonoma de Mexico (UNAM) began incorporating the topic of feminism and other gendered discourse, although it was not a full course it began the discussion about feminism amongst Mexican college students. It was not until the year 2009 a course was created specifically for the Geography of Gender with the help of two geographers who were widely recognized feminists Veronica Ibarra Garcia and Irma Escamilla Herrera (Villagran, 2019).

Preceding later waves, in the early 1900s other women are recognized to be a part of the first wave of feminism — Laureana Wright, Rita Cetina Gutierrez, Dolores Jimenez y Muro, Dolores Correa Zapata, and Mateana Murguia de Aveleyra — who began laying down the ground work for feminism in Mexico. These women were pioneers of the moment, they were writers during a time when it was not common for women to write. They were very atypical in many aspects as in a mostly catholic country they were freemasons, protestants, revolutionists, and spiritualists. In 1883, the first female student was admitted to the National Preparatory School, marking a major early achievement for the movement.

=== Standpoint ===
Since the 1980s, standpoint feminists have argued that feminism should examine how women's experience of inequality relates to that of racism, homophobia, classism and colonization. In the late 1980s and the 1990s, postmodern feminists argued that gender roles are socially constructed, and that it is impossible to generalize women's experiences across cultures and histories.

=== Third-world ===
Third-world feminism has been described as a group of feminist theories developed by feminists who acquired their views and took part in feminist politics in so-called third-world countries. Although women from the third world have been engaged in the feminist movement, Chandra Talpade Mohanty and Sarojini Sahoo criticize Western feminism on the grounds that it is ethnocentric and does not take into account the unique experiences of women from third-world countries or the existence of feminist movements indigenous to third-world countries. According to Mohanty, women in the third world feel that Western feminism bases its understanding of women on "internal racism, classism and homophobia", a phenomenon which has been referred to by others as imperial feminism. This discourse is strongly related to African feminism and postcolonial feminism. Its development is also associated with black feminism, womanism, "Africana womanism", "motherism", "Stiwanism", "negofeminism", chicana feminism, and "femalism".

=== Transfeminism ===
Transfeminism (or trans feminism) is, a movement by and for trans women, was defined by Robert Hill, "a category of feminism, most often known for the application of transgender discourses to feminist discourses, and of feminist beliefs to transgender discourse". Hill says that transfeminism also concerns its integration within mainstream feminism. He defines transfeminism in this context as a type of feminism "having specific content that applies to transgender people, but the thinking and theory of which is also applicable to all women".

Transfeminism includes many of the major themes of other third-wave feminism, including diversity, body image, oppression, misogyny, and women's agency. It is not merely about merging trans concerns with feminism, but often applies feminist analysis and critiques to social issues facing trans women and trans people more broadly. Transfeminism also includes critical analysis of second-wave feminism from the perspective of the third wave.

Early voices in the movement include Kate Bornstein and Sandy Stone, whose essay The Empire Strikes Back was a direct response to Janice Raymond. In the 21st century, Susan Stryker and Julia Serano have contributed work in the field of transgender women.

=== Religion ===
Feminist historians have begun to focus on the contributions of religion to the development of feminist thought and protest. Miriam Cooke highlighted the importance of Islam to Muslim women in the post-colonial Arab world to navigate the interconnectivity of their faith and gender. Cooke argues that Islamic feminism encourages the re-examination of religious texts to offer a culturally legitimate path to gender equality. She argues that the representation and acknowledgement of Islamic Feminism is needed to diversify the wider feminist tradition.

== Women and feminism in the United States ==
=== Asian American feminism ===
The first wave of Asian women's organizing formed out of the Asian American movement of the 1960s, which in turn was inspired by the civil rights movement and the anti-Vietnam War movement. During the Second Wave of feminism, Asian American women provided services for battered women, worked as advocates for refugees and recent immigrants, produced events spotlighting Asian women's cultural and political diversity, and organized with other women of color. Asian Sisters, which emerged in 1971 out of the Asian American Political Alliance, is an early Asian American women's group based out of Los Angeles that focused on drug abuse intervention for young women. Networking between Asian American and other women during this period also included participation by a contingent of 150 Third World and white women from North America at the historic Vancouver Indochinese Women's Conference (1971) to work with the Indochinese women against U.S. imperialism.

==== History ====
After World War II when immigration laws began to change, an increasing number of Asian women began to migrate to the United States and joined the workforce. Asian women who worked in the textile and garment industry faced gender discrimination as well as racism.

Following the African American and Chicana feminist movements of the 1960s, Asian American women activists began to organize and participated in protests with Asian American men to fight racism and classism. The first organized movement formed by Asian American women followed the Asian American movement in the 1960s, which was influenced by the Civil Rights Movement and anti-Vietnam War sentiment. However, as Asian American women's participation became increasingly active, they faced sexism and realized that many of the organizations did not recognize their needs and struggles as women.

While Asian American women believed that they face the same social and equality issues as Asian American men, many Asian American men did not share the same sentiment.

==== Important figures and movements ====
In the mid-1960s when more and more Asian women began immigrating to the United States, they faced gender discrimination and racism in the workforce. Au Quon McElrath, who was a Chinese labor activist and social workers, began organizing and advocating for increased wages, improved working environments, additional health benefits, and maternity leaves for women workers.

When Asian American women activists started to recognize a need for a separate movement from the sexism that they faced, they began to develop a feminist consciousness and initialized organizations to fight for women's rights and to fight against sexism. Some groups developed caucuses within organizations like the Organization of Chinese American Women, which was an already existing Asian American organization.

Within the Asian American cultural arts movement, many artists such as poet Janice Mirikitani rose to fame within the Asian American community.

==== Modern Asian American feminism ====
Though recent decades, Asian American feminism and feminist identity continues to struggle with the perception of Asian Americans as part of the Model minority, which has affected and shaped the political identity of Asian American women as women of color in the United States.

Additionally, globalized trade agreements like the North American Free Trade Agreement and the General Agreement on Tariffs and Trade have changed the dynamics of the labor force and work environments in the United States. In the free-trade capitalist global economy, protection of workers' rights and working environment has weakened dramatically, disproportionately disadvantaging women workers, especially women of color.

=== Native American feminism ===
Women of All Red Nations (WARN) was initiated in 1974, and is one of the best known Native American women's organizations whose activism included fighting sterilization in public health service hospitals, suing the U.S. government for attempts to sell Pine Ridge water in South Dakota to corporations, and networking with indigenous people in Guatemala and Nicaragua. WARN reflected a whole generation of Native American women activists who had been leaders in the takeover of Wounded Knee in South Dakota in 1973, on the Pine Ridge reservation (1973–76), and elsewhere. WARN as well as other Native American women's organizations, grew out of—and often worked with—mixed-gender nationalist organizations.

The American Indian Movement was founded in 1968 by Dennis Banks, George Mitchell, and Mary Jane Wilson, an Anishinabe activist.

==== History ====
Native American feminist ideology is founded upon addressing two often overlooked issues: one, that the United States as well as other Western nations are settler colonial nation states, and second, colonialism is gendered. United States colonialism and patriarchy disproportionately impact the experiences of Native American women who face this "double burden" of both racism and sexism and the resulting discrimination. Thus, the history of Native American feminism has always been entwined with the processes of colonialism and imperialism.

==== Important figures and movements ====
Because of strong anti-colonial sentiments and the unique experience of Native Americans as a society that was colonized by American settlers, Native American feminist ideology is characterized by the rejection of feminist politics and their background as indigenous women. In the early 1990s, Annete Jaime, in "American Indian Women: At the Center of Indigenous Resistance in North America," argues that only Native women who have assimilated consider themselves as feminists. Jaime states that supporting the equality and political freedom of Native American women activists means the rejection of feminist politics as feminist politics is tied to the colonial history of the United States.

The indigenous movement of Native American women also involves the preservation of Native spirituality by organizations such as Women of All Red Nations and the Indigenous Women's Network. Native spirituality includes the cultural contextualization of kinship roles through cultural beliefs, rituals, and ceremonies, strengthening and preserving the fluid bond between the individual and the "indigenous homeland". The expectation of indigenous spirituality manifested in the "feminine organic archetypes" such as images like the Corn Mother and Daughter, Spider Woman, and Changing Woman of Southwest Pueblo lore found in Native creation myths.

==== Modern Native American feminism ====
In the United States, more Native American women die from domestic violence than any other women. The issue of domestic violence has caused many Native American feminists to reject the assumption and notion that women in Native American communities must continue to defend the ideal of tribal nationalism when certain aspects of tribal nationalism ignore very pertinent problems of sexism and women's liberation from colonization.

Andrea Smith, an activist for women of color and especially Native American women, organized the first "Color of Violence: Violence against Women of Color Conference." During this conference, notable African American scholar and activist Angela Davis spoke on the continual colonial domination and oppression of indigenous nations, highlighting and emphasizing the experience of violence towards Native women. Davis also pointed out the gendered nature of the legislative and judicial process in nation-states as well as the inextricable link between the federal government and male dominance, racism, classism, and homophobia.

In modern Native American feminism, there has been an emergence of politically significant art forms and media. The art combines past and current history, addresses racism and sexism, and breaks down the social and media representation and stigmas of persons of color.

=== Chicana feminism ===
Chicana feminism focuses on Mexican American, Chicana, and Hispanic women in the United States. Hijas de Cuauhtemoc was one of the earliest Chicana feminist organizations in the Second-wave of feminism founded in 1971, and named after a Mexican women's underground newspaper that was published during the 1910 Mexican Revolution. The Comisión Femenil Mexicana Nacional was founded in October 1970. The Comisión Femenil Mexicana Nacional is an organization of women who enhance and promote the image of Chicana/Latina women in all levels of society.

==== History ====
The movement highlighting the struggles and issues experienced by Chicanas, as women of color in the United States, emerged primarily as a result of the politics and dynamics of the national Chicano movement. During the 1960s, the Chicano movement, characterized by a nature of protest, fought for equality, social justice, and political and economic freedoms, and during this period in time, many other struggles and organizations were sparked by the movement. The Chicano movements and protests also saw the participation of Chicanas, who through the movement, became aware of the potential rewards as well as their own roles within the movement and society. As a result, Chicana feminism developed towards the end of the 1960s and early 1970s. Through the subsequent movement, Chicanas publicized their struggle for equality with Chicano men and questioned and challenged their traditional cultural, societal, and familial roles.

==== Important figures and movements ====
The primary movement which saw the emergence of Chicana feminism in the United States began in the 1960s and 1970s following the Chicano movement. Chicana feminism, built upon and transformed the ideologies of the Chicano movement, was one of the United States' "second wave" of feminist protests. Like many prominent movements during the 1960s-1970s error, "second wave" Chicana feminism arose through protests across many college campuses in addition to other regional organizations. Youth participation in the movements was more aggressive due to influence from active civil rights and black liberation protests occurring nationally.

==== Modern Chicana feminism ====
Since the "second wave" Chicana feminist movement, many organizations have developed in order to properly address the unique struggles and challenges that Chicanas face. In addition, Chicana feminism continues to recognize the life conditions and experiences that are very different from those that white feminists face. As women of color, Chicanas continue to fight for educational, economic, and political equality.

== Women and feminism in South America ==
=== Colombian feminism ===
Feminism in Colombia

In the twentieth century, the firsts feminism organizations appeared in Colombia. Women who fight for the basic rights of other women. The history of feminism in Colombia is divided into two moments; the first one that went from the thirties to the sixties- where the main purpose of those moments was to criticize the inequality of civil rights that women and minorities were victims. The second one from the sixties to the present; that denounce the inequality in aspects like sexuality and reproductive rights.

History

At the beginning of the last century the creation and the organization of social and feminist movements start in Colombia. Until the 1930s, under the mandate of the Liberal political parties the women's movements managed to consolidate and create a feminism movement, that fought and defend civil and political rights for women. In 1944, the "Union Femenina de Colombia" (the Colombian Women's Union), " Alianza Femenina" (Women's Alliance) and "Agitacion Femenina" (Women's Agitation) emerged. those organizations focused their efforts on achieving the right to vote for all women, which would arrive almost 10 years later.

In 1948 during XI Conference of the OAS (Organization of American States) it was approved the Convention about the political and civil rights for women. Thus, under the government of the president Gustavo Rojas Pinilla, three thousand women, led by Esmeralda Arboleda, Magdalena Feti, and Isable Lleras. Demand to the government the compliance of the convention. under the pressure of women movements allows them to be include in the constitutional reform of 1954, and with that win the right to vote.

Important figures and movements:

Juana Julia Guzmán in 1917, she created "El Centro de Emancipacion Femenina" (Women Emancipation center), also in 1919, she was one of the main founders of the "Sociedad de Obreros y Artesanos de Córdoba" (Workers and artisans society of Córdoba). her fights for women and minorities rights was ended because she was victim of political persecution.

María Cano was the leader of the "Movimiento Obrero" (Workers movement). she worked on the diffusion of the socialist ideas in Colombia and she consolidate movement that demand civil rights for the working and peasant population.

==== Modern Colombian feminism movements: ====
With the process of peace in effect in the whole country, new feminists movements have emerged and this is the case of "Viejas Verdes," "Siete Polas," and "Estamos Listas" movements that use the technology and the social media to have a more significant social impact. Their primary purpose is to obtain political, social, sexual, educational, economic, and labor equality among people.

Although women can vote for the first time around 62 years ago, their participation in the national politic is still minimum and unequal compare to men. An example of that is that in congress, women are just the 19.7% of members.

== Causes of diversity ==
Some argue that every feminist has an altered standpoint on the movement due to the varying hurdles women of different backgrounds come across. Depending on class some women will have different experiences of the patriarchy and experienced oppression to different degrees. Others may argue that Western feminism has been responsible for creating an atmosphere of 'me, not you', upholding the oppressive Western state in order to prioritize the security of white women and consequently leaving women who belong to trans or minority ethnic communities behind. Another division has been caused by the increased call for trans rights in the West; issues surrounding the blurred line that exists between the feminist movement and the trans-rights movement and whether trans women should be included in mainstream feminist discourse or be seen as a movement in its own right. Issues have also arisen over how 'masculine' and 'feminine' have been defined and whether previously gendered values are nature or nurture.

== Shared perspectives ==
Movements share some perspectives while disagreeing on others.

=== Men as oppressed with women ===
Some movements differ on whether discrimination against women adversely affects men. Movements represented by writers Betty Friedan and Gloria Steinem consider men oppressed by gender roles. Friedan argued that feminism would benefit both genders and was part of the human rights movement. Steinem suggested that liberation was for both genders, as men's burdens would be shared. Susan Faludi wrote, in Stiffed, that men, while not currently rebelling, can rebel on a scale with women and liberate both genders toward a more humane world. Ellen Willis, weighing economics and feminism, considered an alliance with men necessary to women's liberation. Florynce Kennedy wrote, "Men are outraged, turned off, and wigged out, by threats that women might withdraw consent to oppression, because they—men—subconsciously (and often consciously) know that they—men—are oppressed." Mary Wollstonecraft wrote, "From the respect paid to property flow ... most of the evils and vices which render this world such a dreary scene to the contemplative mind.... One class presses on another; for all are aiming to procure respect on account of their property .... [M]en wonder that the world is almost, literally speaking, a den of sharpers or oppressors." She argued for the usefulness of men "feel[ing] for" men; while she objected to men wanting of women only that they be "pleasing" to men. She said, "To say the truth, I not only tremble for the souls of women, but for the good natured man, whom everyone loves." According to Kristin Kaisem, a common interest in the upward mobilization of women as a whole has prompted a desire for a more inclusive and universal feminist movement.

=== Men as oppressors of women ===
Other movements consider men primarily the causative agents of sexism. Mary Daly wrote, "The courage to be logical—the courage to name—would require that we admit to ourselves that males and males only are the originators, planners, controllers, and legitimators of patriarchy. Patriarchy is the homeland of males; it is Father Land; and men are its agents." The Redstockings declared that men, especially a few leading men, oppress women and that, "All men receive economic, sexual, and psychological benefits from male supremacy. All men have oppressed women." In a somewhat less clear-cut position, Kate Millett wrote in Sexual Politics that our society, like others in the past, is a patriarchy, with older men generally being in charge of younger men and all females.

== Criticism ==
Some have argued that the wide diversity in feminist ideologies has hindered the collaboration of some feminist subdivisions. On the other hand, Linda M.G. Zerilli and Donna Haraway assert that different discourses within feminism can be artificially separated through taxonomies, and it is this separation rather than ideological incompatibility that has impeded constructive conversation on subjectivity. Critics have argued that "same" means "equal" and that women can never be the same as men. Feminism would respond by claiming that women might not be physically the same as men but they still have the right to be equal.
