= Uma Narayan =

American feminist

Academic background
- Education: Rutgers University
- Thesis: Offensive conduct: what is it and when may we legally regulate it? (1990)

Academic work
- Institutions: Vassar College
- Main interests: Feminism Postcolonialism Postcolonial Feminism
- Notable works: Dislocating Cultures: Identities, Traditions and Third World Feminism

Uma Narayan is an American feminist scholar and a current professor of philosophy at Vassar College on the Andrew W. Mellon Chair of Humanities. Narayan's work focuses on the epistemology of the inequities involving postcolonial feminism.

== Education ==
Narayan finished high school at Bombay Scottish School, Mahim, received her B.A. in philosophy from Bombay University and her M.A. in philosophy from Pune University, India. Uma Narayan received her Ph.D. from Rutgers University in 1990. In Singing in the Fire: Stories of Women in Philosophy she reveals her experience of moving to the United States in 1987 for graduate studies and being disheartened by the revolutionary feminist thinking progressing outside academia, while stating there was, "not a trace of feminist philosophy in the curriculum." Narayan defined the most valuable experience from graduate school to be joining the newly formed Laurie Chair women's studies seminar. This opportunity allowed connections to other original member, Allison Jaggar as well as article publications and lead to the acceptance of her current position at Vassar College.

== Career ==
Dislocating Cultures: Identities, Traditions and Third World Feminism is Narayan's most notable work, in which feminism is disputed as a Western notion and challenges the assumption that Indian feminism is derivative of Western models. Critical of the identifying Indian culture as unified and homogeneous through historical contextualization of the nationalist uses and defenses of the Indian practices of sati and dowry murders. Narayan rejects the charges of "Westernization" on Indian feminism and the historicization of the condition of Indian women is used to criticize radical feminist claims that all women everywhere are constituted by the same concerns and interests. These arguments align her with theorists such as Chandra Mohanty and Gayatri Spivak. The emphasis of Narayan's work lies in decolonizing feminism and articulating the issues surrounding global feminism.

Related to her work in Dislocating Cultures, Narayan has criticized culture-reductionist forms of postcolonial feminism which, "in attempting to take seriously these cultural differences...risk replacing gender-essentialist analyses with culturally essentialist analyses that replicate problematic colonialist notions about the cultural differences between 'Western culture' and 'non-Western cultures' and the women who inhabit them." She dubs this view of culture which covers up divisions and differences of both cultures to be neatly packaged. This false view can be avoided, for instance, through historical analysis of culture.

Her early research and writing began in the field of Indian legal studies and progressed to her graduate thesis Offensive Conduct: What is it and When May We Regulate It? Her published work includes considerations of Benegal Narsing Rau's influence on the provisions of the Constitution of India and writing primers on Indian legal literature.

Narayan coedited Reconstructing Political Theory: Feminist Perspectives with Mary L. Shanley, Decentering the Center: Philosophy for a Multicultural, Postcolonial, and Feminist World with Sandra Harding, and Having and Raising Children: Unconventional Families, Hard Choices, and the Social Good with Julia Bartkowiak. She currently is a professor of philosophy at Vassar College on the Andrew W. Mellon Chair of Humanities. Her regular philosophy courses offerings include Contemporary Moral Issues, Social and Political Philosophy and Feminist Theory. As well as courses for the Women's Studies program, such as Introduction to Women's Studies and Global Feminism.

== Selected bibliography ==
- Narayan, Uma. Dislocating Cultures: Identities, Traditions, and Third-World Feminism. Routledge, 1997.
- Narayan, Uma (1997), "Contesting Cultures : "Westernization," Respect for Cultures, and Third-World Feminists", in Nicholson, Linda (ed.), The Second Wave: A Reader in Feminist Theory, New York: Routledge, pp. 396–412, ISBN 9780415917612.
- Narayan, Uma. "Essence of Culture and a Sense of History: A Feminist Critique of Cultural Essentialism." Hypatia 13.2 (1998): 86–106.
- Narayan, Uma. "The Project of Feminist Epistemology: Perspectives from a Nonwestern Feminist." The Feminist Standpoint Theory Reader: Intellectual and Political Controversies (2004): 213–224.
- Narayan, Uma. "Working Together Across Difference: Some Considerations on Emotions and Political Practice." Hypatia 3.2 (1988): 31–48.
- Narayan, Uma. "Eating Cultures: Incorporation, Identity and Indian food." Social Identities 1.1 (1995): 63–86.
- Narayan, Uma. "“Male‐Order” Brides: Immigrant Women, Domestic Violence and Immigration Law." Hypatia 10.1 (1995): 104-119.
- Narayan, Uma. "Colonialism and Its Others: Considerations on Rights and Care Discourses." Hypatia 10.2 (1995): 133–140.
- Narayan, Uma. "Appropriate Responses and Preventive Benefits: Justifying Censure and Hard Treatment in Legal Punishment." Oxford Journal of Legal Studies 13.2 (1993) 166–182.
- Narayan, Uma. "Basic Indian Legal Literature for Foreign Legal Professionals," International Journal of Legal Information: Vol. 37: Iss. 3 (2010): Article 8.
- Narayan, Uma. Sisterhood and "Doing Good": Asymmetries of Western Feminist Location, Access and Orbits of Concern. Feminist Philosophy Quarterly 5 (2) (2019).
- Narayan, Uma. Begging for Justice: Free Speech, Equal Protection, and a Legal Ban on Begging. Social Philosophy Today 8 (1993):151-163.

== See also ==
- Postcolonial feminism
- Transnational feminism
