= Ann Russo =

Ann Russo is an American researcher and educator based in Chicago, Illinois. She is a professor of Women's and Gender Studies at DePaul University, where she also teaches courses in Critical Ethnic Studies, Peace, Justice and Conflict Studies, and LGBTQ Studies. Her research focuses on social movement praxis, accountability within feminist organizing, queer theory, and transformative justice. Russo previously served as director of the Women's Center and was a member of the advisory board for LGBTQ Studies at DePaul. She was the first full-time faculty member in the Department of Women's and Gender Studies, which was founded at DePaul University in 1985.

== Public speaking and presence ==
In 2020, Russo participated in a panel conversation with three other directors of women's and gender centers at Northwestern University's annual Women's Center symposium. She presented on intersectionality, transnational feminisms, and pedagogy at the National Women's Studies Association Conference in 2023. In 2024, Russo contributed to a session on identity politics in the classroom at DePaul's 29th Annual Teaching and Learning Conference. In March 2025, she co-drafted and signed an open letter urging DePaul University's administration to resist executive orders affecting higher education, diversity, equity, inclusion initiatives, and immigrant populations.

== Awards and honors ==
Russo served on the planning committee for Sexual Assault Awareness Month in 2018, alongside Greek life coordinator Natalie Stone and LGBTQA center coordinator Michael Riley. The three were recognized with a Collaboration Award from the Division of Student Affairs for this project. In 2019, she was inducted into the Society of Vincent de Paul, a Catholic organization supporting services for the poor, at DePaul's academic convocation.

== Selected works ==
- Author. 2019. Feminist Accountability: Disrupting Violence and Transforming Power. New York: New York University Press.
- Co-editor (with Sandra Jackson). 2002. Talking Back and Acting Out: Women Negotiating the Media Across Cultures. New York: Peter Lang.
- Author. 2001. Taking Back Our Lives: A Call to Action for the Feminist Movement. New York: Routledge.
- Co-author (with Cindy Jenefsky). 1998. Without Apology: Andrea Dworkin's Art and Politics. Boulder, CO: Westview Press.
- Co-author (with Chandra Talpade Mohanty and Lourdes Torres). 1991. Third World Women and the Politics of Feminism. Bloomington, IN: Indiana University Press.
- Author. "Ten Strategies for Building Community Accountability," in Alice Kim, Erica Meiners, Jill Petty, Audrey Petty, Beth Richie, Sarah Ross, eds., The Long Term: Resisting Life Sentences Working Toward Freedom (Haymarket 2018).
- Author. “Brokenheartedness and Accountability," Journal of Lesbian Studies Vol. 21, No. 3 (2017): 289-305.
- Author. “Stone Soup: Building Community, Creating Family - The Expansive Possibilities of Queer Love," with Francesca Royster, in Dustin Goltz and Jason Zingsheim, eds., Queer Praxis: Questions for LGBTQ Worldmaking (Peter Lang, 2015).
- Author. “Between Speech and Silence: Reflections on Accountability" in Silence and Power: Feminist Reflections at the Edges of Sound, edited by Sheena Malhotra and Aimee Carrillo Rowe. NY: Palgrave MacMillan, 2013.
- Co-author (with Aimee Carrillo Rowe). “Anti-Racist Interventions in the Academy: Toward a Feminist Politics of Relation and Accountability," in Kimberly Vaz and Gary Lemons, eds., Feminist Solidarity at a Crossroads: Intersectional Women's Studies for Transracial Alliance. NY: Routledge, 2012.
- Author. “Stop the False Race-Gender Divide," co-authored with Melissa Spatz. In Who Should be First?, edited by Beverly Guy-Sheftall and Johnnetta Betsch Cole. Albany, NY: SUNY Press.
- Author. “Epilogue: The Future of Intersectionality: What's at Stake." In Michele T. Berger and Kathleen Guidroz, eds., The Intersectional Approach: Transforming the Academy through Race, Class, and Gender. Chapel Hill, NC: University of North Carolina Press, 2009: 309-18.
- Author. “Women's Studies: Cultivating Accountability as a Practice of Solidarity." In Alice Ginsberg (ed.), The Evolution of American Women's Studies: Reflections on Triumphs, Controversies and Change. New York: Palgrave, 2008.
- Co-author. Communities Engaged in Resisting Violence. With Melissa Spatz, Executive Director, Women and Girls CAN. Report for Women and Girls Collective Action Network, 2007.
- Author. “The Feminist Majority Foundation's Campaign to Stop Gender Apartheid: The Intersections of Feminism and Imperialism in the United States," International Feminist Journal of Politics, Vol. 8, No. 4 (2006): 557-80.
