= The Tyee =

Canadian news website

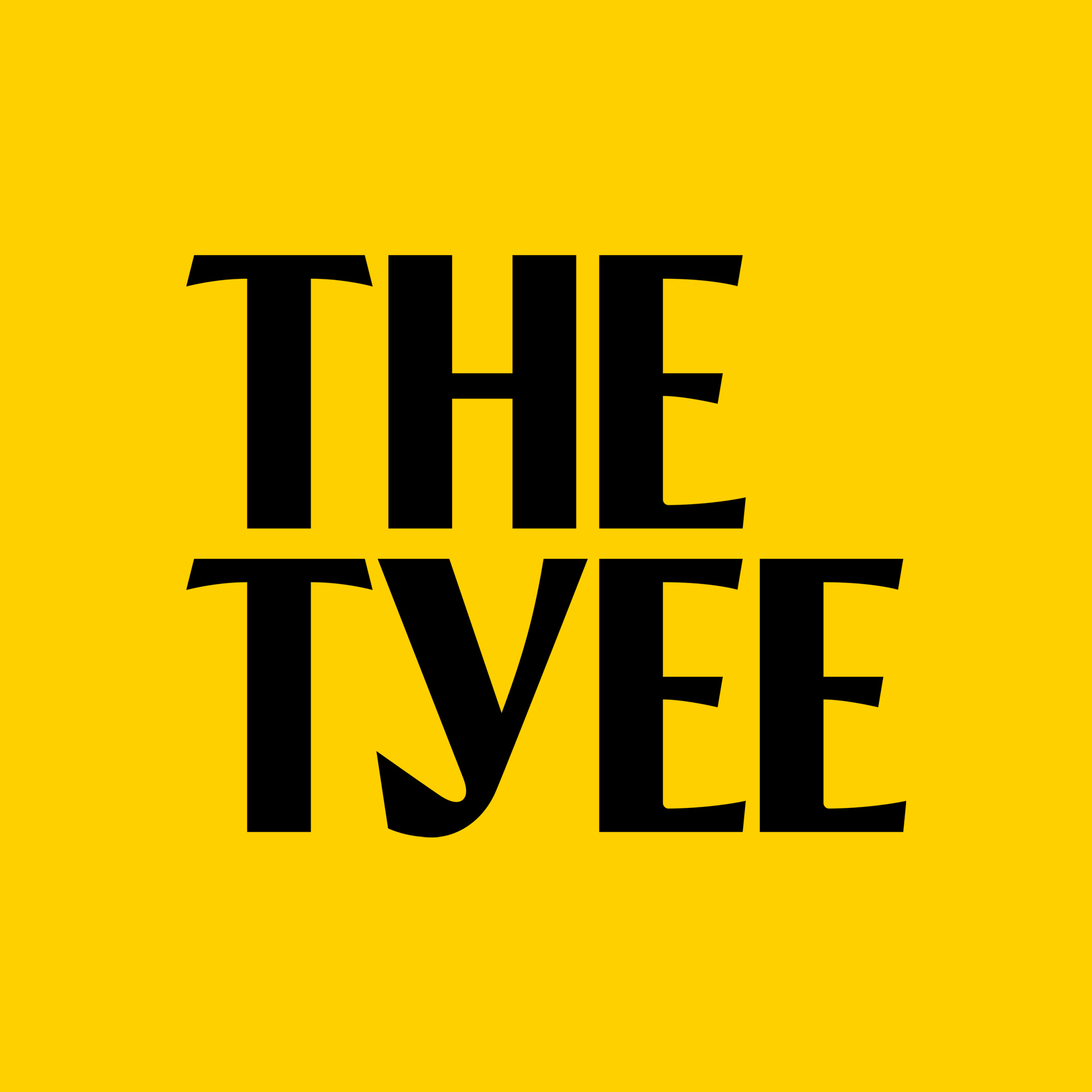
- Type: Daily
- Format: Online
- Founder: David Beers
- Publisher: Jeanette Ageson
- Editor-in-chief: David Beers
- Managing editor: andrea bennett
- Founded: November 2003
- Language: English
- Headquarters: Vancouver, British Columbia
- Website: thetyee.ca

The Tyee is an independent daily news website based in Vancouver, British Columbia, Canada. It was founded in November 2003 as an alternative to corporate media. Articles in The Tyee focus on politics, culture, and life.

The Tyee was founded by David Beers, a writer and former features editor at The Vancouver Sun. Over the years the outlet has attracted attention not just for its news coverage, but also for its non-traditional funding model. The Nieman Lab called it one of the "kookiest" revenue strategies it had ever seen, incorporating advertising, donations and equity sales in its funding model, and even renting out space in its newsrooms. In 2015, The New Yorker magazine called The Tyee "a fascinating case study" of how local journalism is funded. The Tyee reported its site received approximately 8 million visitors in 2021, with similar readership figures the year before.

== History ==
In October 2001, Beers wrote a Vancouver Sun editorial about freedom of speech in which he defended sociologist Sunera Thobani. A week later, the Vancouver Sun's publisher, CanWest, fired Beers citing "budgetary restraints". Beers regarded CanWest's decision, which coincided with other firings of senior CanWest journalists, as political. Beers said, "When I was fired it was kind of a wake-up call, I was writing some forthright things after 9/11—they weren't radical, I didn't think, but they challenged the jingoistic tone of many commentators and politicians in Canada as well as the US."

The Tyee launched in November 2003. Its original premise was "Investigative journalism no one else is doing, and fresh viewpoints from all over B.C." The name "Tyee" is based on the current local definition of Tyee salmon — a Chinook salmon or Spring salmon weighing 30 lbs or more. The word is derived from the Nuu-chah-nulth language and means chief, king, or champion. According to founder David Beers, the name embodies the magazine's dedication to publishing "lively, informative news and views", and because staff "roam free, and go where we wish." While an illustration of a Chinook salmon was originally used in The Tyee's logo, it was removed in 2022 because "the word [Tyee] meant so much more to the people who created it".

In 2008, The Tyee launched a new blog called The Hook. According to investigative editor and overseer, Monte Paulsen, The Hook was a "superblog" because it published quick, frequent, timely reports and analyses by experienced Tyee journalists and a wide network of contributors, unlike most blogs that offer works of one or two journalists. Posts were approximately 200-300 words in length, allowing coverage of a greater number and variety of topics. The Hook was retired in 2014.

The Tyee was a founding member of the defunct independent media association Press Forward, which launched in December 2020. On December 3, 2021, Robyn Smith announced that she would be leaving her editor-in-chief role that March, with founder David Beers stepping in as interim editor-in-chief. On February 16, 2022, The Tyee announced senior editor Andrea Bennett would become managing editor, with contributor Jackie Wong joining as the outlet's new senior editor. Paul Willcocks is also a senior editor at The Tyee. On February 28, 2022, Jeanette Ageson and David Beers announced the media outlet had transitioned to a non-profit model at the start of the year, a process that had been in the works since 2018. Peter Klein, Michelle Hoar, Melody Ma and Deblekha Guin joined The Tyee as its board of directors. The Tyee is now operated by The Tyee Independent Media Society. Ageson and Beers wrote the outlet's non-profit status makes it clear that "we do not exist to enrich any owner. We won't be bought or sold or merged. We will spend every dollar on more and better journalism." The announcement was accompanied by a logo and website redesign.

== Awards ==
In 2007, The Tyee was recognized nationally by the Canadian Journalism Foundation with an Honourable Mention in the category of Excellence in Journalism for Small, Medium, or Local Media. It was awarded the Edward R. Murrow Award by the Radio and Television News Directors Association in 2009 and 2011. It also won the Canadian Journalism Foundation Excellence in Journalism Award in 2009 and 2011.

At 2020 Digital Publishing Awards, The Tyee received gold for General Excellence in the Small Publication category. It was awarded The Bill Good Award for making "a significant contribution to journalism in the province" at the 2021 Webster Awards. The same year, it won "B.C. Magazine of the Year" at the Alberta Magazine Awards.

== Funding ==
In 2010, according to Beers, The Tyee's annual revenue of about $500,000 to $600,000 included $450,000 from ongoing sale of equity, $75,000 from advertising, $50,000 from grants, $25,000 from reader donations, and several thousand from renting out newsroom desks. The outlet has steadily increased its reliance on reader donations since 2009 through its Tyee Builders membership program. The Tyee has been commended for its creative and unique fundraising efforts, from offering merchandise and signed books to giving donors editorial sway. For example, Beers provided donors a choice of which issues The Tyee should cover during Canada's 2009 elections — the pledge brought in $25,000 in 10 days. In 2014, a campaign to "take The Tyee national" raised $118,000 in three weeks.

Until 2018, The Tyee was owned by a majority and minority shareholder. The majority shareholder was Working Enterprises, a family of companies affiliated with the British Columbia Federation of Labor that also includes insurance, travel and financial services firms that cater to Canadian union members. In exchange for an annual subsidy of $300,000, Working Enterprises owned two-thirds of The Tyee's theoretically for-profit operation. Investors Eric Peterson and Christina Munck were The Tyee's minority shareholder at the time. In 2018, Peterson and Munck were asked to step in as the outlet's sole investor.

In a 2016 Canadaland interview with Jesse Brown, Beers said that "special interests" always fund media. "I can't imagine a media that isn't funded by special interest". In 2019, The Tyee projected 29 per cent of its annual revenue would come from reader contributions. By 2020, that number had risen to 34 per cent and in 2021 The Tyee reported 47 per cent of its revenue came from reader donations. The Tyee has received funding from progressive U.S. fiscal sponsor Tides Foundation, which it reported on its website. It also receives funding from government and private donors such as Eric Peterson and Christina Munck.

On February 28, 2022, Beers and publisher Jeanette Ageson announced the media outlet had transitioned to a non-profit model, a process that had been in the works since 2018. Regarding the non-profit transition, Eric Peterson wrote in a March 1, 2022, op-ed on the site: "It is ultimately contradictory for an entity that purports to champion independent journalism to be privately owned, even if its owners are merely caretakers".
