= Sunera Thobani =

Feminist sociologist, academic, and activist

- Born: 1957 (age 68–69); Tanzania
- Citizenship: Canadian
- Education: Middlesex University (B.A.); University of Colorado (M.A.); Simon Fraser University (PhD)
- Occupations: sociologist; educator; writer; activist
- Title: President of the National Action Committee on the Status of Women
- Term: 1993–1996
- Predecessor: Judy Rebick
- Successor: Joan Grant-Cummings

Sunera Thobani (born 1957) is a Tanzanian-Canadian feminist sociologist, academic, and activist. Her research interests include critical race theory, postcolonial feminism, anti-imperialism, Islamophobia, Indigeneity, and the war on terror. She is currently a professor in the Department of Asian Studies at the University of British Columbia. Thobani is also a founding member of Researchers and Academics of Colour for Equality/Equity (R.A.C.E.), the former president of the National Action Committee on the Status of Women (NAC), and the director for the Centre for Race, Autobiography, Gender, and Age (RAGA).

== Early life and education ==
Thobani was born in 1957 in Tanzania to parents of South Asian descent. After spending her childhood in East Africa, she attended Middlesex University in England, completing her bachelor's degree in 1986. In 1989, Thobani received a master's degree from University of Colorado in the United States. Deciding to further her education in Canada, Thobani later went on to earn a PhD in sociology from Simon Fraser University in 1998.

== Academic career ==
From 1996 to 2000, Thobani taught women's studies at Simon Fraser University. During her stay at Simon Fraser, she also served as the Ruth Wynn Woodward Endowed Professor and chair. Thobani has also previously lectured at Evergreen State College, a liberal arts college in Olympia, Washington. Since 2000, she has been teaching at the University of British Columbia. She is currently a professor in the Department of Asian Studies.

== Activism ==
=== Early activist work ===
Thobani was an avid activist throughout her undergraduate and graduate career. Since the 1980s, she has been associated with the anti-racist movement, anti-apartheid movement, third world solidarity movements, and various women's movements. As an undergraduate student living in the United Kingdom, she worked with different South Asian women's organizations. Thobani also spent a year volunteering in Palestine. Furthermore, as a graduate student in the United States, she was involved in anti-nuclear, peace, and Palestinian solidarity movements.

After arriving in Vancouver in 1989 as a doctoral candidate, she quickly became affiliated with the National Action Committee on the Status of Women (NAC)—then the largest feminist organization in Canada. At the same time, she continued to work closely with women of color activists in Ontario and Quebec. However, Thobani quickly gained national prominence after the Women of Color caucus within NAC nominated her for a presidential run. In 1993, Thobani was elected as the 12th President of NAC—the first woman of color in the organization's history. Securing the blessing of her predecessor—socialist feminist Judy Rebick—Thobani focused on making the organization a more inclusive space for women of color. She served as president for three years; and in 1996, she was succeeded by another woman of color, Joan Grant-Cummings.

=== Later activism ===
From 2008 to 2012, Thobani became the Director for the Centre for Race, Autobiography, Gender, and Age (RAGA). Working collaboratively with other community organizations for equity and social justice, RAGA focuses on the importance autobiography and oral histories.

Alongside feminists Sherene Razack and Yasmin Jiwani, Thobani also co-founded Researchers and Academics of Colour for Equality/Equity (R.A.C.E.). It is a collaborative coalition of First Nations, Inuit, Métis, Non-status Indians, people of color, and white allies who are engaged in the production of critical academic and activist knowledges. R.A.C.E. is a non-profit committed to anti-racist, anti-colonial, and feminist scholarship and praxis.

== Speeches and controversies ==
=== NAC presidency ===
Thobani's academic and activist work has garnered both support and backlash. Her 1993 appointment to the office of NAC president outraged some Canadians. Notably, on 23 April 1993, Tory MP John Alexander Frances MacDougall (Timiskaming) questioned Thobani's citizenship status in the House of Commons of Canada—referring to her as an "illegal immigrant." His comments sparked outrage. Acting NAC President, Judy Rebick, labelled MacDougall's line of questioning "irresponsible and reprehensible," as well as "sexist and racist."

However, MacDougall's concerns did resonate with some Canadians. For instance, some white Canadian women viewed Thobani's NAC appointment as divisive. One particular woman—identifying herself as a fifth-generation white Canadian—wrote to the Toronto Star in order to express her doubts about Thobani's ability to represent "women whose forebears built this country."

Thobani, herself, responded to MacDougall's speech—ultimately perceiving it as "an attack on all immigrants—that our presence is not valued here."

=== 9/11 speech ===
On 1 October 2001, Thobani gave a speech at the "Women's Resistance: From Victimization to Criminalization" conference concerning the September 11 attacks. This speech—which rejected an ahistorical framing of the recent attacks—launched a firestorm of controversy. In it, she stated that:

"U.S. foreign policy is soaked in blood. And other countries of the West including "shamefully" Canada, cannot line up fast enough behind it. All want to sign up now as Americans and I think it is the responsibility of the women's movement in this country to stop that, to fight against it."

Many Canadians regarded Thobani's speech as inflammatory, "anti-American," and too soon after such a great tragedy. As a result, she was accused by an anonymous resident of a criminal hate crime, an allegation investigated by the police. RCMP Corporal Michael Labossiere observed that "Normally, people think it's a white supremist or Caucasians, promoting hate against visible minorities…We want to get the message out that it's wrong, all around."

Yet, others sympathized with Thobani's plight, viewing it as a "McCarthy-style witch-hunt." For instance, Murray Mollard—lawyer and executive director of the British Columbia Civil Liberties Association—reflected that "We need to have an open debate about our response to Sept. 11." He did not think that freedom of speech and public academic dissent should be curtailed.

Soon, members of the Canadian public were demanding that Thobani be fired from the University of British Columbia for her comments. She also began receiving menacing phone calls, copious amounts of porn, and hate mail from both Canadians and Americans. In response to the hate crime allegations and the intense national scrutiny, Thobani maintained that "This is just pure harassment.... They are trying to silence dissent in this country."

About three weeks later Labossiere offered an apology for his media statements against Thobani, and police said they would not charge her with a hate crime. A version of her speech, "War Frenzy," has since been incorporated into the Great Canadian Speeches anthology, initially published in 2004.

== Selected publications ==
=== Books ===
- Hellwig, Tineke, and Sunera Thobani, eds. Asian Women: Interconnections. Toronto: Women's Press, 2006. ISBN 978-0889614574
- Thobani, Sunera. Exalted Subjects: Studies in the Making of Race and Nation in Canada. Toronto: University of Toronto Press, 2007. ISBN 978-0802094544
- Razack, Sherene, Thobani, Sunera, and Malinda Smith, eds. States of Race: Critical Race Feminism for the 21st Century. Toronto: Between the Lines, 2010. ISBN 978-1897071595
- Thobani, Sunera. Contesting Islam, Constructing Race and Sexuality: The Inordinate Desire of the West. London: Bloomsbury Academic, 2020. ISBN 978-1350148109
- Thobani, Sunera (Ed.). Coloniality and Racial (In)Justice in the University: Counting for Nothing? Toronto: University of Toronto Press, 2021. ISBN 978-1487523817
- Thobani, Sunera (Ed.). The Deadly Intersections of COVID-19: Race, States, Inequalities and Global Society. Bristol University Press, 2022. ISBN 978-1529224665

== See also ==
- Chandra Talpade Mohanty
- Himani Bannerji
