= David Beers =

Canadian journalist

David Beers is a Canadian journalist and founder of the news website, The Tyee. He previously served as managing editor of the San Francisco Examiner, senior editor at Mother Jones magazine, and features editor at the Vancouver Sun. He is a faculty member in the Graduate School of Journalism at the University of British Columbia.

== Early life ==
Beers was born in 1957 and grew up in San Jose, California, where his father worked for Lockheed as a satellite test engineer. He attended Santa Clara University in Santa Clara, California.

== Journalism career ==
Beers’s work has been published in magazines including the Los Angeles Times Magazine and Harper's. In 1994, "We’re No Angels" was a finalist for the Canadian National Magazine Award. He served as managing editor of the San Francisco Examiner, senior editor at Mother Jones magazine, and features editor at the Vancouver Sun.

In October 2001, Beers wrote a Vancouver Sun editorial about freedom of speech in which he defended sociologist Sunera Thobani. A week later, the Vancouver Sun's publisher, CanWest, fired Beers citing "budgetary restraints". Beers regarded CanWest's decision, which coincided with other firings of senior CanWest journalists, as political.

In 2003, Beers started an online publication in Vancouver, British Columbia called The Tyee. Funded in large part by non-profit groups, the British Columbia Federation of Labour and an advertising agency called Quest Advertising, the Tyee's goal is to publish news and opinion not adequately covered by the mainstream news media.

His book, Blue Sky Dream: A Memoir of America's Fall from Grace, is based on his essay, "The Crash of Blue Sky California", which won the American National Magazine Awards when it appeared in Harper's.

== Works ==
- "The Public Sphere and Online, Independent Journalism", CSSE
- Beers, David (May 10, 2001). "It's all good: The appeal of Deepak Chopra". Salon. Archived from the original on August 22, 2012.
- Blue Sky Dream: A Memoir of America's Fall from Grace (1996)
- Liberalized: The Tyee Report on British Columbia Under Gordon Campbell's Liberals (2005)
- Points of Interest: In Search of the Places, People, and Stories of B.C (2024)
