= Razack =

Given name

Razack is a given name. Notable people with the name include:

- Abdool Razack Mohamed Kt, MP (1906–1978), Indian born former key Mauritian Minister in the pre and post-independence cabinet of Mauritius
- Abdou Razack Traoré (born 1988), Ivorian-born Burkinabe footballer
- Abraham Razack, SBS, JP (born 1945), the member of the Legislative Council of Hong Kong (LegCo)
- K. M. Abdul Razack, Indian politician and former Member of the Legislative Assembly of Tamil Nadu
- Sherene Razack, a Canadian postcolonial, anti-racist feminist scholar and activist of Indian descent

== See also ==
- Fatel Razack, the first ship to bring indentured labourers from India to Trinidad
