= Sherene Razack =

- Born: Trinidad and Tobago
- Education: Rennes 2 University; University of British Columbia (BA); University of Ottawa (MA); University of Toronto (PhD)
- Scientific career
- Fields: Racial violence, women's studies, feminism, critical race theory
- Workplaces: University of California, Los Angeles; Ontario Institute for Studies in Education
- Website: Racialviolencehub.com

Sherene Razack (/ʃəˈriːn ˈræzæk/) is a Distinguished Professor and the Penny Kanner Endowed Chair in Women's Studies in the Department of Gender Studies, University of California at Los Angeles. As a feminist critical race scholar, her research and teaching focus on racial violence. She is best known for her contributions to feminist and critical race studies about discrimination against Muslim and Indigenous women in Canada, systemic racism in the Canadian justice system, and colonial violence against Indigenous peoples worldwide. She is the founder of the virtual research and teaching network Racial Violence Hub (RVHub). Formerly a Distinguished Professor of Critical Race and Gender Studies in the Department of Social Justice, the Ontario Institute for Studies in Education (OISE) of the University of Toronto (1991–2016), she relocated to the United States from Canada in 2016.

== Education ==
Razack attended Rennes 2 University where she obtained a certificate in French studies in 1976. In 1977, Razack continued her studies at the University of British Columbia where she earned a bachelor's degree and honors in history. In 1979, Razack completed a master's degree in history at the University of Ottawa. In 1989, Razack completed her doctoral degree in the field of education at the University of Toronto.

== Recurring themes in work ==
A feminist critical race scholar, Razack has published six single-authored books and three edited and co-edited collections, as well as over eighty journal articles and book chapters. Her publications illustrate the thematic areas and anti-colonial, anti-racist feminist scholarship she pursues. Razack frequently discusses and denounces "race thinking," a term she coined to refer to the ways in which white people deny people of color "a common humanity." Razack's work is rooted in the idea that Canada is a white-settler society that impedes on the land, bodies, and rights of Indigenous peoples, and that dehumanizes and enacts violence on minority groups.

== Controversy ==
In early August 2002, Razack, the director of OISE's Centre for Integrative Anti-racism Studies at the time, wrote a letter about the Israeli–Palestinian conflict. In it she denounced Israeli "atrocities beyond belief" enacted on the Palestinian people during the Battle of Jenin, and the ongoing Israeli military occupation of Palestine. The letter and a Pro-Palestine petition it introduced were emailed to the University of Toronto's student body and faculty. The letter was signed by 15 professors from the U of T, and 22 professors not affiliated with the university. Simon Rosenblum, a spokesman for the Canadian Jewish congress, called the letter "a prejudicial, inflammatory and highly biased view" of the Israeli–Palestine conflict that "pays no attention to Israel's attempts to achieve peace nor Israel's legitimate need for self-defence." B'nai Brith Canada took issue with the letter's content's because it created "a poisoned environment [...] for Jewish students at U of T." According to the organisation, the letter created an atmosphere in which Jewish students, associated to Israel because of their religion and ethnicity, were subject to anti-Semitic attitudes.

The U of T defended Razack, as Jane Stirling, a spokeswoman for the university, declared to the press that "faculty at a university must be able to voice unpopular or controversial ideas." Another spokeswoman echoed this idea, re-affirming that the "U of T does not muzzle its community when it comes to political discourse." However, acting president Shirley Neuman underlined that Razack was not speaking on behalf of the University of Toronto when she wrote the letter as Razack instead specifically stated that she was speaking on the behalf of "Canadian scholars meeting at the First National Conference on Critical Race Scholarship and the University." The link to the letter and the petition were removed from the Ontario Institute for Studies in Education (OISE) website in late August 2002.

== Select publications ==
Below is a partial list of Razack's publications.

=== As author ===
- Canadian Feminism and the Law: The Women's Legal Education and Action Funds and the Pursuit of Equality (1991)
- Looking White People in The Eye: Gender, Race, and Culture in Courtrooms and Classrooms (1998)
- Dark Threats and White Knights: The Somalia Affair, Peacekeeping, and the New Imperialism (2004)
- Casting Out: The Eviction of Muslims from Western Law and Politics (2008)
- Dying from Improvement: Inquests and Inquiries into Indigenous Deaths in Custody (2015)

=== As editor ===
- Race, Space, and the Law: Unmapping a White Settler Society (2002)
- States of Race: Critical Race Feminism for the 21st Century (co-edited with Malinda Smith and Sunera Thobani) (2010)
- At the Limits of Justice Women of Colour on Terror (co-edited with Suvendrini Perera) (2014)

== Select honors and awards ==
- 2018: Special Issue of Canadian Journal of Women and the Law, Vol. 30, No. 3 dedicated to scholarship inspired by Razack.
- 2016: Distinguished Professor Award, University of Toronto.
- 2008, 2002: University of Toronto Connaught Fellowship.
- 2004: Counterpunch's Edward Said award for the ten top books on empire, given for Dark Threats and White Knights
- 2003: Canadian Association of Law and Society, Award for best article published in Canadian Journal of Law and Society 2000–2002. Award given for article “Gendered Racial Violence and Spatialized Justice.”

== See also ==
- Idle No More
- Sex workers' rights
- Racism in Canada
