= Imperialist feminism =

Use of feminism to justify imperialism

Imperialist feminism, also known as colonial feminism, imperial feminism, or intersectional imperialism, refers to instances where critics argue that feminist rhetoric is used to justify empire-building or imperialism. The term has gained prominence in the 20th and 21st centuries, with one scholar asserting that it "privileges inequality through gender bending that masquerades as gendered equality... Imperial feminism privileges empire building through war." The related term intersectional imperialism refers to the foreign policy of Western nations that are perceived as engaging in or supporting imperialistic policies while promoting inclusive and progressive rhetoric at home.

In academia and women's studies discourse, imperial feminism and its related terms critique Western feminism's attitudes toward non-white and non-Western countries. Critics argue that it perpetuates inaccurate and demeaning stereotypes about the status of women in the Global South. Western feminism has been critiqued for creating an image of non-white and non-Western women as being in a lower socioeconomic position than they actually are. Additionally, "imperial feminism" is used to describe instances where racist viewpoints are displayed toward marginalized ethnic groups not part of mainstream feminism. Some scholars suggest that postcolonial feminism developed partly in response to these attitudes from their Western counterparts.

== Early history ==
The term "imperial feminism" has its roots in the expansion of European colonial empires in the 18th and 19th centuries. As Europeans came to rule large populations of non-white and non-Western people, they justified the so-called "civilizing mission" by arguing that women in these nations were oppressed by the male population due to sexist ideologies. Colonial rule, they claimed, would liberate these women from the oppression of their male counterparts.

Palestinian-American historian Edward Said characterizes this phenomenon as part of "Orientalism" and claims that European scholarship, culture, and society perpetuated stereotypes about non-Western civilizations to justify control over them. Among these practices, the subjugation of women was heavily criticized and used by colonial powers as a justification for their continued rule. Cultural practices such as sati, child marriage, and pardah were pointed to as evidence of the "backwardness" of Oriental nations. In Southwest Asia and North Africa, colonial powers fixated on the Islamic veil as a symbol of oppression. Evelyn Baring, a colonial administrator in Egypt, was known for his campaigns against the veil, which he claimed oppressed Egyptian women. In the colonial Philippines, Westerners were horrified by the social acceptance of women's exposed breasts in public, perceiving this as an obscenity that required intervention. Europeans viewed these practices as evidence of the need for European rule, providing an ideological justification for colonialism.

== Recent usage ==
After the September 11 terrorist attacks, the United States and its allies launched an invasion of Afghanistan. Among the rhetoric used to justify the war, some arguments focused on the plight of women under the Taliban. First Lady Laura Bush made several radio speeches claiming that the American invasion would help liberate Afghan women from Taliban oppression. In one speech, she stated, "Civilized people throughout the world are speaking out in horror – not only because our hearts break for the women and children in Afghanistan, but also because in Afghanistan, we see the world the terrorists would like to impose on the rest of us." Bush made similar arguments throughout her husband's presidency, prompting Mother Jones to write in 2007 that Laura Bush had taken the lead in pushing "a tidy moral justification for [the U.S.] invasion of Afghanistan."

A few months after the invasion, Bush celebrated the U.S.'s apparent progress toward emancipating Afghan women:

Because of our recent military gains, in much of Afghanistan women are no longer imprisoned in their homes. They can listen to music and teach their daughters without fear of punishment. Yet, the terrorists who helped rule that country now plot and plan in many countries, and they must be stopped. The fight against terrorism is also a fight for the rights and dignity of women.

These arguments have been criticized by some, including American writer Akbar Shahid Ahmed, who argues that while Bush's rhetoric appears beneficial on the surface, it may undermine America's goals in Afghanistan by allowing the Taliban to frame women's empowerment as a form of American control. Additionally, Ahmed raises the question of whether "critical efforts to help women secure the status of full citizens... really need to be tied to U.S. militarism."

== See also ==
- Asian women
- Convention on the Elimination of All Forms of Discrimination Against Women
- Cultural imperialism – Cultural aspects of imperialism
- Equal opportunity
- Femen – Feminist activist group
- Gender equality
- Gender inequality – Idea and situation that women and men are not treated as equal
- History of feminism
- Human rights – Fundamental rights belonging to all humans
- International feminism
- Intersectional feminism
- Islamic feminism
- Mahnaz Afkhami
- Orientalism – Imitation or depiction of Eastern cultures
- Performative feminism
- Pinkwashing
- Postcolonial feminism
- Power (social and political) – Ability to influence the behaviour of others
- Purplewashing – Use of feminist aesthetics to promote organisations
- Racial equality
- Radical feminism
- Transnational feminism – Feminist movements and ideology
- Women in Islam
- Women's rights
- Women for Women International
