= Maxine Baca Zinn =

American sociologist and academic

- Born: June 11, 1942 (age 83); New Mexico, United States
- Education: B.A., Sociology, California State College, Long Beach (1966); M.A., Sociology, University of New Mexico (1970); Ph.D., University of Oregon (1978)
- Occupations: Professor, researcher, author
- Notable work: Gender Through the Prism of Difference, Social Problems, Diversity in Families,
- Spouse: Alan Zinn
- Children: One

Maxine Baca Zinn (born June 11, 1942), née Baca, is an American sociologist known for her work on gender, race, and ethnicity and particularly, the experience of women of color at the intersection of race, class, and gender.

Baca Zinn has published a large number of articles and book chapters as well as co-authored several sociology books on the family. Much of her work focuses specifically on Mexican American families.

== Early life and education ==
Maxine Baca Zinn was born on June 11, 1942, in Santa Fe, New Mexico, to Presente and Louise Duran Baca. She grew up in Santa Fe where she met and married her high school sweetheart, Alan Zinn. She attended California State College, Long Beach in Los Angeles County, California, where she completed her Bachelor of Arts in Sociology in 1966. She earned her Master of Arts in Sociology from the University of New Mexico in 1970 and became a member of Phi Kappa Phi honor society in 1971 before moving on to complete her Ph.D. in sociology at the University of Oregon, in 1978. She is currently professor emerita of Sociology at Michigan State University.

== Career ==
After completing her undergraduate work in 1966, Baca Zinn worked for two years as a fourth grade Catholic school teacher in the Los Angeles area while her husband completed his studies. In 1968 the young family returned to New Mexico where Maxine enrolled in a Sociology Masters program and began working as a graduate teaching assistant providing instruction in the New Careers Program (1969–1971) and Sociology (1970–1971) until she graduated and moved on to the University of Oregon. At Oregon, she held graduate teaching fellowships until 1973 when she was awarded a dissertation fellowship from the Ford Foundation. In 1975, she moved to Flint, Michigan where she began a teaching appointment at the University of Michigan instructing courses in sociology and Chicano Studies (1975–1978) and became assistant professor, then professor of sociology until 1990 when she moved to Michigan State University as professor and Senior Research Associate at the Julian Samora Research Institute. While in her positions at Michigan State and University of Michigan, Baca Zinn has completed a number of visiting professorships concurrent positions within her institutions.

== Awards ==
She has been awarded several honors including the Faculty Special Merit Award for Scholarly or Creative Achievement (1975), the Distinguished Faculty Award from the Michigan Association of Governing Boards (1982), the Cheryl Miller Lecturer Award on Women and Social Change (1989), alumnus awards from both California State University, Long Beach (1990) and the University of New Mexico (1993), the Meyers Center Book Award for the Study of Human Rights in North America (1997) and two prestige awards from the American Sociological Association in 2000.
