= Malinda S. Smith =

Political scientist

- Education: Western Michigan University; University of Alberta
- Scientific career
- Fields: Political science
- Workplaces: Athabasca University (until 2004); University of Alberta
- Thesis: Power, ideology and the construction of the Contra/revolution. (1993)

Malinda S. Smith is a Canadian political scientist. She is the inaugural Vice-Provost of Equity, Diversity, and Inclusion, an Associate Vice President Research and a full professor of political science at the University of Calgary. Previously, she was a professor of political science at the University of Alberta, where she also held a 2018 Pierre Elliott Trudeau Foundation Fellow and served as a Provost Fellow in Equity, Diversity, and Inclusion Policy in the Office of the Provost. She specializes in equity, social justice, diversity and intersectionality studies, particularly as they are practiced in higher education institutions, as well as in international relations, comparative politics, African security studies and international inequality.

== Career ==
=== Education ===
Smith obtained a PhD in political science (International Relations and Political Philosophy) from the University of Alberta. She also played field hockey for the University of Alberta and the province of Alberta. Before joining the Department of Political Science in the Faculty of Arts at the University of Alberta in 2004, she was a professor at Athabasca University in Athabasca, Alberta.

In 2020 Smith moved from the University of Alberta to the University of Calgary, where she was appointed the inaugural Vice-Provost of Equity, Diversity, and Inclusion, and a full professor of political science.

=== Research ===
Smith is the co-author of The Equity Myth: Racialization and Indigeneity at Canadian Universities (2017). She has been the editor or co-editor of 7 books. She was the sole editor of Globalizing Africa (2003), Beyond the African Tragedy: Discourses on Development and the Global Economy (2006), and Securing Africa: Post-9/11 Discourses on Terrorism (2010). She is the co-editor of 4 books, including Critical Concepts: An Introduction to Politics, 5/E (Pearson, 2013), 6/E (Oxford UP, 2023), Nuances of Blackness in the Canadian Academy (2022), and States of Race: Critical Race Feminism for the 21st Century (2010). Many of Smith's articles in peer-reviewed journals have focused on equity, diversity, inclusion, and accessibility in academia, including systematic studies of diversity among the leadership of the U15 Group of Canadian Research Universities and the recipients of the Canada Research Chair program.

Smith's work has been cited, or she has been quoted on topics related to her work, in news outlets like the Edmonton Journal, the Calgary Herald, CBC News, The Globe and Mail, The Toronto Star, Maclean's, and La Rotonde.

=== Positions ===
Smith has been the President and the Vice President of the Canadian regional branch of the International Studies Association, and was its 2018-19 Distinguished Scholar. She has also served as the President and the Vice President of the Academic Women's Association at the University of Alberta. She has also been the Vice President for Equity Issues at the Canadian Federation for the Humanities and Social Sciences, and a Provost Fellow in Equity, Diversity, and Inclusion Policy at the University of Alberta.

In 2020, Smith was named the inaugural Vice Provost (Equity, Diversity, and Inclusion) at the University of Calgary in Calgary, Alberta, with a starting date in August 2020.

=== Awards ===
Smith received a Distinguished Alumni Award from the University of Alberta in 2025, a Her Legacy Award for Education by the When African Women Talk (WAWT) in 2025, a Friends of Diversity/Amis de la Diversity Award from Diversity Magazine in 2024, a Lifetime Achievement Award from the Calgary Black Chamber in 2023, a Doctor of Laws, honoris causa, from Simon Fraser University in 2021. She was named a Compelling Calgarian by the Calgary Herald in 2021. She received the Rosalind Smith Professional Award from the National Black Coalition of Canada Society in Edmonton in 2020, named one of 100 Accomplished Black Canadian Women in 2020, and given the Susan S. Northcutt Award from the Women's Caucus of the International Studies Association in 2020. In 2018-19 she was the recipient of the Distinguished International Studies Scholar Award by the International Studies Association-Canada. Smith was also named a 2018 Fellow of the Pierre Elliott Trudeau Foundation; the Foundation gives $225,000 distributed over 3 years to "five fellows each year in recognition of outstanding achievement, innovative approaches to issues of public policy, and commitment to public engagement". The purpose of Smith's Fellowship was to support her book project, A Seat at the Table: Engendering Black Canadian Pasts and Futures, which aims to centre Black Canadians in Canada's national stories about its legal, political, and educational systems.

From 2018 to 2020 Smith also held the Provost Fellowship (Equity, Diversity and Inclusion Policy) at the University of Alberta. In 2018 she was a Viola Desmond Award Honoree from Ryerson University (now Toronto Metropolitan University) and received the Equity, Diversity, and Inclusion Award from the University of Alberta. In 2016 Smith received the HSBC Community Contributor of the Year Award "given to a person who goes above and beyond to affect change in Canadian society as it relates to diversity and inclusion, human rights and equity". She was the recipient of the 2015 Equity Award of the Canadian Association of University Teachers for "outstanding contributions to equity and collective bargaining".
