= Postcolonial feminism =

Branch of feminism centered in non-Western cultures

Postcolonial feminism is a form of feminism that developed as a response to feminism focusing solely on the experiences of women in Western cultures and former colonies. Postcolonial feminism seeks to account for the way that racism and the long-lasting political, economic, and cultural effects of colonialism affect non-white, non-Western women in the postcolonial world. Postcolonial feminism originated in the 1980s as a critique of feminist theorists in developed countries pointing out the universalizing tendencies of mainstream feminist ideas and argues that women living in non-Western countries are misrepresented.

Postcolonial feminism argues that by using the term "woman" as a universal group, women are then only defined by their gender and not by nationality, social class, occupation, age, race, ethnicity, religion, language, or sexual preference. Postcolonial feminists also work to incorporate the ideas of indigenous and other Third World feminist movements into mainstream Western feminism. Third World feminism stems from the idea that feminism in Third World countries is not imported from the First World, but originates from internal ideologies and socio-cultural factors.

Postcolonial feminism is sometimes criticized by mainstream feminism, which argues that postcolonial feminism weakens the wider feminist movement by dividing it. It is also often criticized for its Western bias.

== History ==
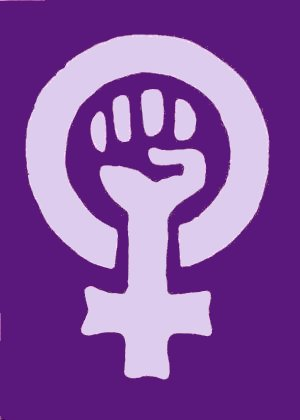
Feminism logo originating in 1970

The history of modern feminist movements can be divided into three waves. When first-wave feminism originated in the late nineteenth century, it arose as a movement among white, middle-class women in the global North who were reasonably able to access both resources and education. Thus, the first wave of feminism almost exclusively addressed the issues of these women who were relatively well off. The first-wavers focused on absolute rights such as suffrage and overturning other barriers to legal gender equality. This population did not include the realities of women of color who felt the force of racial oppression or economically disadvantaged women who were forced out of the home and into blue-collar jobs. However, first-wave feminism did succeed in getting votes for women and also, in certain countries, changing laws relating to divorce and care and maintenance of children.

Second-wave feminism began in the early 1960s and inspired women to look at the sexist power struggles that existed within their personal lives and broadened the conversation to include issues within the workplace, issues of sexuality, family, and reproductive rights. It scored remarkable victories relating to Equal Pay and the removal of gender based discriminatory practices. First and second-wave feminist theory failed to account for differences between women in terms of race and class—it only addressed the needs and issues of white, Western women who started the movement. Postcolonial feminism arose in the 1980s within the third wave of feminism, alongside other racially focused feminist movements that aimed to reflect the diverse lived experiences of women. Audre Lorde contributed to the creation of Postcolonial Feminism with her 1984 essay "The Master's Tools Will Never Dismantle the Master's House". Chandra Talpade Mohanty's essay "Under Western Eyes" also came out in 1984, analyzing the homogenizing western feminist depiction of the "third world woman." These works, along with many others, were foundational to the formation of postcolonial feminism.

Many of the first key theorists of postcolonial feminism hail from India and were inspired by their direct experiences with the effects that colonization had left in their society. When colonizers came to India, an importance that was not as prevalent before was placed on gender. Many women lost power and economic autonomy as men gained much more of it, and this had a lasting effect even after India gained independence

In efforts to move away from grand narratives stemmed from globalization, postcolonial theory was formed as a scholarly critique of colonial literature. By acknowledging the differences among diverse groups of women, postcolonial feminism addresses what some call the oversimplification of Western feminism as solely a resistance against sexist oppression. Postcolonial feminism, in contrast, also relates gender issues to other spheres of influence within society.

== Theory ==
Postcolonial feminism is a relatively new stream of thought, developing primarily out of the work of the postcolonial theorists who concern themselves with evaluating how different colonial and imperial relations throughout the nineteenth century have impacted the way particular cultures view themselves. This particular strain of feminism promotes a wider viewpoint of the complex layers of oppression that exist within any given society. Scholars such as C. Sarah Soh have examined how colonial and postcolonial structures shaped gendered experiences and their representation in national memory.

Postcolonial feminism began simply as a critique of both Western feminism and postcolonial theory, but later became a burgeoning method of analysis to address key issues within both fields. Unlike mainstream postcolonial theory, which focuses on the lingering impacts that colonialism has had on the current economic and political institutions of countries, postcolonial feminist theorists are interested in analyzing why postcolonial theory fails to address issues of gender. Postcolonial feminism also seeks to illuminate the tendency of Western feminist thought to apply its claims to women around the world because the scope of feminist theory is limited. In this way, postcolonial feminism attempts to account for perceived weaknesses within both postcolonial theory and within Western feminism. The concept of colonization occupies many different spaces within postcolonial feminist theory; it can refer to the literal act of acquiring lands or to forms of social, discursive, political, and economic enslavement in a society.

Audre Lorde's foundational essay "The Master's Tools Will Never Dismantle the Master's House" argues that western feminism fails third world women by relying on the same patriarchal tools that oppress them. Lorde found that western feminist literature denied differences between women and discouraged embracing them. The differences between women, Lorde asserts, should be used as strengths to create a community in which women use their different strengths to support each other.

Chandra Talpade Mohanty, a principal theorist within the movement, addresses this issue in her seminal essay "Under Western Eyes". In this essay, Mohanty asserts that Western feminists write about Third World women as a composite, singular construction that is arbitrary and limiting. She states that these women are depicted in writings as victims of masculine control and of traditional culture without incorporating information about historical context and cultural differences with the Third World. This creates a dynamic where Western feminism functions as the norm against which the situation in the developing world is evaluated. Mohanty's primary initiative is to allow Third World women to have agency and voice within the feminist realm.

In the article "Third World Women and the Inadequacies of Western Feminism", Ethel Crowley, sociology professor at Trinity College of Dublin, writes about how western feminism is lacking when applied to non-western societies. She accuses western feminists of theoretical reductionism when it comes to Third World women. Her major problem with western feminism is that it spends too much time in ideological "nit-picking" instead of formulating strategies to redress the highlighted problems. The most prominent point that Crowley makes in her article is that ethnography can be essential to problem solving, and that freedom does not mean the same thing to all the women of the world.

== Relationship to Western feminisms ==
Postcolonial feminism began as a criticism of the failure of Western feminism to cope with the complexity of postcolonial feminist issues as represented in Third World feminist movements. Postcolonial feminists seek to incorporate the struggle of women in the global South into the wider feminist movement. Western feminists and feminists outside of the West also often differ in terms of race and religion, which is not acknowledged in Western feminism and can cause other differences. Western feminism tends to ignore or deny these differences, which discursively forces Third World women to exist within the world of Western women and their oppression to be ranked on an ethnocentric Western scale.

Postcolonial feminists do not agree that women are a universal group and reject the idea of a global sisterhood. Understanding the aims of feminist movements and the similarities and differences in women's struggles worldwide therefore requires examining what truly unites women. The aim of the postcolonial feminist critique to traditional Western feminism is to strive to understand the simultaneous engagement in more than one distinct but intertwined emancipatory battle.

This is significant because feminist discourses are critical and liberatory in intent and are not thereby exempt from inscription in their internal power relations. The hope of postcolonial feminists is that the wider feminist movement will incorporate these vast arrays of theories which are aimed at reaching a cultural perspective beyond the Western world by acknowledging the individual experiences of women around the world. Ali Suki highlights the lack of representation of women of color in feminist scholarship comparing the weight of whiteness similar to the weight of masculinities. This issue is not due to a shortage of scholarly work in the global South but a lack of recognition and circulation. This reinforces Western hegemony and supports the claim of outweighed representation of white, Western scholars. Most available feminist literature regarding the global South tends to be written by Western theorists resulting in the whitewashing of histories.

Feminist postcolonial theorists are not always unified in their reactions to postcolonial theory and Western feminism, but as a whole, these theorists have significantly weakened the bounds of mainstream feminism. The intent of postcolonial feminism is to reduce homogenizing language coupled with an overall strategy to incorporate all women into the theoretical milieu. While efforts are made to eliminate the idea of the Third World "other", a Western Eurocentric feminist framework often presents the "other" as victim to their culture and traditions. Brina Bose highlights the ongoing process of "alienation and alliance" from other theorists in regards to postcolonial feminism; she emphasizes, "...the obvious danger both in 'speaking for' the silent/silenced as well as in searching for retaliatory power in elusive connections..." There is a tendency throughout many different academic fields and policy strategies to use Western models of societies as a framework for the rest of the world. This critique is supported in other scholarly work including that of Sushmita Chatterjee who describes the complications of adding feminism as a "Western ideological construct to save brown women from their inherently oppressive cultural patriarchy."

== Relationship to postcolonial theory ==
The postcolonial feminist movements look at the gendered history of colonialism and how that continues to affect the status of women today. In the 1940s and 1950s, after the formation of the United Nations, former colonies were monitored by the West for what was considered social progress. The definition of social progress was tied to adherence to Western socio-cultural norms. The status of women in the developing world has been monitored by organizations such as the United Nations. As a result, traditional practices and roles taken up by women, sometimes seen as distasteful by Western standards, could be considered a form of rebellion against colonial rule. Some examples of this include women wearing headscarves or female genital mutilation. These practices are generally looked down upon by Western women, but are seen as legitimate cultural practices in many parts of the world fully supported by practicing women. Thus, the imposition of Western cultural norms may desire to improve the status of women but has the potential to lead to conflict.

In order to understand the postcolonial feminist theory, one must first understand the postcolonial theory. Sociological postcolonial theory analyzes the social effects of European colonialism, arguing that the modern world is incomprehensible without analyzing its history of and relationship to colonial rule and imperialism. Postcolonialism can provide an outlet for citizens to discuss various experiences from the colonial period. These can include: "migration, slavery, oppression, resistance, representation, difference, race, gender, place and responses to the influential discourses of imperial Europe." Ania Loomba critiques the terminology of 'postcolonial' by arguing the fact that 'post' implicitly implies the aftermath of colonization; she poses the question, "when exactly then, does the 'postcolonial' begin?" Postcolonial feminists see the parallels between recently decolonized nations and the state of women within patriarchy taking "perspective of a socially marginalized subgroup in their relationship to the dominant culture." In this way feminism and postcolonialism can be seen as having a similar goal in giving a voice to those that were voiceless in the traditional dominant social order. While this holds significant value aiding new theory and debate to arise, there is no single story of global histories and Western imperialism is still significant. Loomba suggests that colonialism carries both an inside and outside force in the evolution of a country concluding 'postcolonial' to be loaded with contradictions.

== Race and religion ==
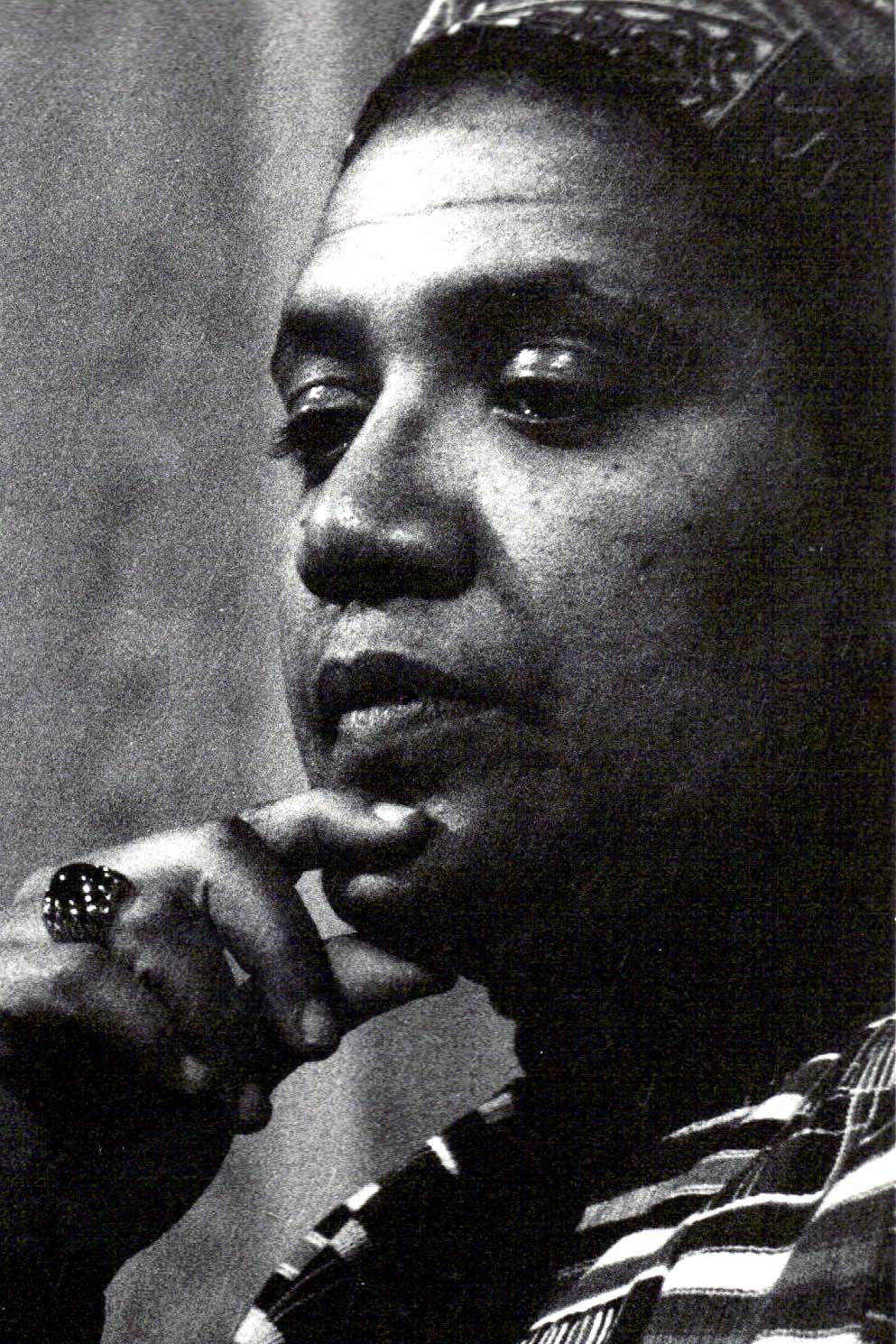
Audre Lorde wrote about postcolonial feminism and race.

Postcolonial feminism has strong ties with indigenous movements and wider postcolonial theory. It is also closely affiliated with black feminism because both black feminists and postcolonial feminists argue that mainstream Western feminism fails to adequately account for racial differences. Racism has a major role to play in the discussion of postcolonial feminism. Postcolonial feminists seek to tackle the ethnic conflict and racism that still exist and aims to bring these issues into feminist discourse. In the past, mainstream Western feminism has largely avoided the issue of race, relegating it to a secondary issue behind patriarchy and somewhat separate from feminism. Until more recent discourse, race was not seen as an issue that white women needed to address.

In her article "Age, Race, Class and Sex: Women Redefining Difference", Lorde succinctly explained that, "as white women ignore their built-in privilege and define woman in terms of their own experiences alone, then women of Color become 'other'..." which prevents the literary work produced by women of color from being represented in mainstream feminism.

Postcolonial feminism attempts to avoid speaking as if women were a homogeneous population with no differences in race, sexual preference, class, or even age. The notion of whiteness, or lack thereof, is a key issue within the postcolonial feminist movement. This is primarily due to the perceived relationship between postcolonial feminism and other racially based feminist movements, especially Black feminism and indigenous feminisms. In Western culture, racism is sometimes viewed as an institutionalized, ingrained facet of society. Postcolonial feminists want to force feminist theory to address how individual people can acknowledge racist presumptions, practices, and prejudices within their own lives attempting to halt its perpetuation through awareness.

Vera C. Mackie describes the history of feminist rights and women's activism in Japan from the late nineteenth century to present day. Women in Japan began questioning their place in the social class system and began questioning their roles as subjects under the Emperor. The book goes into detail about iconic Japanese women who stood out against gender oppression, including documents from Japanese feminists themselves. Japan's oppression of women is written about displaying that women from yet another culture do not live under the same circumstances as women from western/white cultures. Third World feminist ideologies hold that social practices in Asian nations which white feminists might view as oppressive must be interpreted in their cultural context, even as they reject women's oppression or sexualization. Chilla Bulbeck discusses how feminism strives to fight for equality of the sexes through equal pay, equal opportunity, reproductive rights, and education. She also goes on to write about how these rights apply to women in the global South as well but that depending on their country and culture, each individual's experience and needs are unique.

"False consciousness" is perpetuated throughout mainstream feminism assuming that people in the global South don't know what is best for them. Postcolonial framework attempts to shed light on these women as "full moral agents" who willingly uphold their cultural practices as a resistance to Western imperialism. For example, representation of the Middle East and Islam focuses on the traditional practice of veiling as a way of oppressing women. While Westerners may view the practice in this way, many women of the Middle East disagree and cannot understand how Western standards of oversexualized dress offer women liberation. Such Eurocentric claims have been referred to by some as imperial feminism.

== Colonial and postcolonial race influence ==
The U.S., where Western culture flourishes most, has a majority white population of 77.4% as of the 2014 U.S. census. They have also been the majority of the population since the 16th century. Whites have had their role in the colonialism of the country since their ancestors settlement of Plymouth Colony in 1620. Although they ruled majority of the U.S. since their settlement, it was only the men who did the colonizing. The women were not allowed to have the same freedoms and rights that men had at the time. It was not until the victory of World War I that the Roaring Twenties emerged and gave women a chance to fight for independence. It is also the reason that first-wave feminist were able to protest. Their first major accomplishment was the ratification of the Nineteenth Amendment. Some of the women that led the first-wave feminist movement were Susan B. Anthony and Elizabeth Cady Stanton. Anthony, Stanton, and many other feminist fought for the equality of rights for both women and African Americans; however, their accomplishments only benefited white middle-class women. The majority of equality achieved through first and second wave feminism and other movements still benefits mainly the white population. The lack of acknowledgement and acceptance of white privilege by white people is a main contributor to the inequality of rights in the United States. In the book Privilege Revealed: How Invisible Preference Undermines, Stephanie M. Wildman states, "The notion of privilege... has not been recognized in legal language and doctrine. This failure to acknowledge privilege, to make it visible in legal doctrine, creates a serious gap in legal reasoning, rendering law unable to address issues of systemic unfairness." White privilege, oppression, and exploitation in the U.S. and Western influenced countries are main contributors to the formation of other feminist and philosophical movements such as black feminism, Islamic feminism, Latinx philosophy, and many other movements.

== Relationship to Third World feminism ==
While Third-World feminism and postcolonial feminism are often used interchangeably, scholars emphasize that they emerge from distinct yet interrelated political and intellectual traditions. As Nancy A. Naples explains, the term “Third World” popularized during the Cold War to describe countries in Africa, Asia, and Latin America deemed “underdeveloped” by Western powers was soon criticized for reinforcing hierarchies of progress and reproducing the “othering” of non-Western societies. Third-World feminism arose in the 1980s as a transnational and anti-imperialist movement that challenged both Western feminist universalism and global capitalist domination. Rather than attributing women’s oppression to isolated cultural practices, it situates gender inequality within intersecting systems of race, class, and empire. By contrast, postcolonial feminism focuses on how colonial and post-independence political, social, and cultural structures shape gendered subjectivities and national identities. Together, these frameworks reveal how feminist scholarship from the Global South contests the imperial legacies embedded in both Western feminism and global governance, emphasizing that power operates not only through political domination but also through the production of knowledge itself. Chandra Talpade Mohanty argues that Third-World feminism is not just a category of identity but a political and intellectual project that links struggles against gender, racial, class, and imperial oppression within a shared global framework. Rather than assuming that all women share the same experiences, Mohanty envisions solidarity as a process of forming “imagined communities” alliances built through shared political struggle rather than sameness. This idea reframes feminism as a practice of connection across difference, emphasizing accountability to diverse material realities.

Building on this foundation, Nancy A. Naples expands the discussion through her concept of transnational praxis, which highlights how feminist activism and knowledge production cross political and cultural borders while remaining attentive to global inequalities in visibility and power. Naples points out that globalization and digital connectivity can enable feminist collaboration, but they also reproduce hierarchies, since access to platforms, resources, and audiences often remains concentrated in the West. These dynamics are evident in digital culture, where contemporary scholars like Sarah Banet-Weiser and Kate M. Miltner describe “networked misogyny” as the systematic use of online spaces to reinforce patriarchal and racial hierarchies. From a Third-World feminist perspective, these digital patterns of exclusion mirror older imperial structures that privileged Western voices and marginalized others. Journalist Teju Cole’s essay “The White-Savior Industrial Complex” similarly critiques Western humanitarianism for depicting the Global South as dependent on Western rescue, a narrative that reasserts moral and political dominance while ignoring structural injustice. Together, these perspectives show that Third-World feminism extends beyond postcolonial critique: it connects historical systems of empire to the modern global economy and digital technologies that sustain inequality. By revealing how these structures of power intersect, it positions feminist solidarity as a global and ongoing project of decolonization, emphasizing shared responsibility rather than hierarchical aid.

== Double colonization ==
Double colonization is a term referring to the status of women in the postcolonial world. Postcolonial and feminist theorists state that women are oppressed by both patriarchy and the colonial power, and that this is an ongoing process in many countries even after they achieved independence. Thus, women are colonized in a twofold way by imperialism and male dominance.

Postcolonial feminists are still concerned with identifying and revealing the specific effects double colonization has on female writers and how double colonization is represented and referred to in literature. However, there is an ongoing discussion among theorists about whether the patriarchal or the colonial aspect are more pressing and which topic should be addressed more intensively.

The concept of double colonization is particularly significant when referring to colonial and postcolonial women's writing. Kirsten Holst Petersen and Anna Rutherford first introduced the term in 1986 in their anthology "A Double Colonization: Colonial and Postcolonial Women's Writing", which examines female visibility and the challenges female writers face in a male-dominated world. As Aritha van Herk, a Canadian writer and editor, puts it in her essay "A Gentle Circumcision": "Try being female and living in the kingdom of the male virgin; try being female and writing in the kingdom of the male virgin."

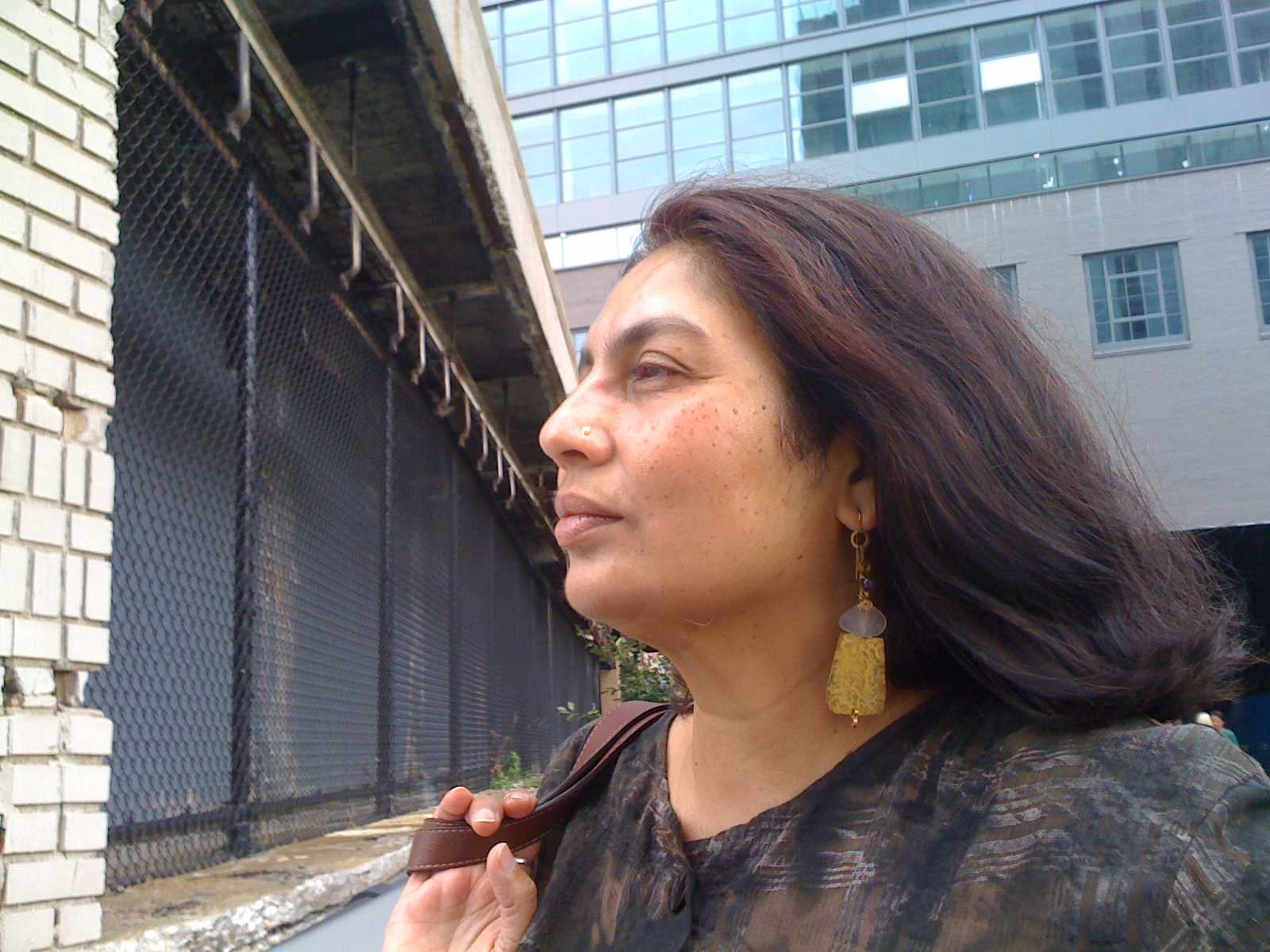
Chandra Talpade Mohanty, author of "Under Western Eyes"

Writers that are usually identified with the topic of double colonization and critique on Western feminism are for example Hazel V. Carby and Chandra Talpade Mohanty. "White Woman Listen!", an essay composed by Carby, harshly critiques Western feminists who she accuses of being prejudiced and oppressors of black women rather than supporters. In this context she also talks about "triple" oppression: "The fact that black women are subject to the simultaneous oppression of patriarchy, class and "race" is the prime reason for not employing parallels that render their position and experience not only marginal but also invisible".

Mohanty's argument in "Under Western Eyes: Feminist Scholarship and Colonial Discourses" goes into the same direction. She blames Western feminists of presenting women of color as one entity and failing to account for diverse experiences.

== Postcolonial feminist literature ==
With the continued rise of global debt, labor, and environmental crises, the precarious position of women (especially in the global south) has become a prevalent concern of postcolonial feminist literature. Other themes include the impact of mass migration to metropolitan urban centers, economic terrorism, and how to decolonize the imagination from the multiple binds of writing as a woman of color. Pivotal novels include Nawal El Saadawi's The Fall of the Iman about the lynching of women, Chimamanda Adichie's Half of a Yellow Sun about two sisters in pre and post war Nigeria, and Giannina Braschi's United States of Banana about Puerto Rican independence. Other major works of postcolonial feminist literature include novels by Maryse Condé, Fatou Diome, and Marie Ndiaye, poetry by Cherríe Moraga, Giannina Braschi, and Sandra Cisneros, and the autobiography of Audre Lorde (Zami: A New Spelling of My Name).

Maria Lugones’ “Toward a Decolonial Feminism” is another piece of postcolonial feminist literature that explores gender norms in relation to the Indigenous people of the United States and the oppression that came with Christianity and the bourgeoisie.

== Critiques ==
As postcolonial feminism is itself a critique of Western feminism, criticism of postcolonial feminism is often understood as a push back from Western feminism in defense of its aims. One way in which the Western feminist movement criticizes postcolonial feminism is on the grounds that breaking down women into smaller groups to address the unique qualities and diversity of each individual causes the entire movement of feminism to lose purpose and power. This criticism claims that postcolonial feminism is divisive, arguing that the overall feminist movement will be stronger if women can present a united front.

Like Western feminism, postcolonial feminism and Third World feminism are also in danger of being ethnocentric, limited by only addressing what is going on in their own culture at the expense of other parts of the world. Colonialism also embodies many different meanings for people and has occurred across the world with different timelines. Chatterjee supports the argument that postcolonial perspective repels "Holistic perspectives of the grand narrative of enlightenment, industrial revolution, and rationality render 'other' histories and people invisible under hegemonic constructions of truth and normalcy." Generalizing colonialism can be extremely problematic as it translates into postcolonial feminism due to the contextual 'when, what, where, which, whose, and how' Suki Ali mentions in determining the postcolonial.

In "Woman Skin Deep: Feminism and the Postcolonial Condition," noted postcolonial feminism critic Sara Suleri contends that the linguistic parallels between feminism and ethnicity raise the question of whether racial identity and feminism are "so radically inseparable." She also states that postcolonial feminism is “not matched with any logical or theoretical consistency” because it reduces sexuality to “the literal structure of the racial body” which is not consistent with postcolonial feminism's stance on the removal of oppressive labels and categorization.

While postcolonial discourse has brought significant expansion of knowledge regarding feminist work, scholars have begun to rework and critique the field of postcolonial feminism developing a more well-rounded discourse termed transnational feminism. Where postcolonial theory highlighted representation and the "othering" of experience of those in the global South, transnational feminism aids in understanding "new global realities resulting from migrations and the creation of transnational communities."

Postcolonial feminism is also criticized for the implications behind its name. The term "postcolonial", consisting of the prefix "post-" and suffix "colonial", insinuates that the countries it is referring to have left the era of colonialism and are progressing from it. This way of thinking promotes the idea that all developing countries underwent colonizing and began the process of decolonizing at the same time when countries referred to as "postcolonial" have actually endured colonization for different time frames. Some of the countries that are called "postcolonial" can in fact still be considered colonial. Another issue with the term "postcolonial" is that it implies a linear progression of the countries it addresses, which starkly contrasts the goal of postcolonial theory and postcolonial feminism to move away from a presentist narrative.

African feminist perspectives African feminist scholars have argued that the effects of colonialism on gender relations in Africa need to be understood within their own historical and cultural contexts rather than through models developed in Europe or North America. Studies show that colonial rule often introduced Victorian ideas about male authority, reorganized economies around wage labour and limited women’s participation in political life, reshaping social systems that had previously been more flexible or structured differently. From this perspective present day gender inequalities are linked not only to patriarchy but also to the lasting impacts of racial hierarchies and global economic pressures established during the colonial period. African feminist writing therefore challenges portrayals of African women as passive recipients of aid instead emphasizing their roles as active agents who resist and transform social conditions in their communities.

== See also ==
- Chicana feminism
- Coloniality of gender
- Feminationalism
- Global feminism
- Gypsy feminism
- History of feminism
- Imperial feminism
- Indigenous feminism
- Intersectionality
- Islamic feminism
- Latinx philosophy
- Postfeminism
- Purplewashing
- Sex segregation and Islam
- Transnational feminism
- Womanism
