= Chandra Talpade Mohanty =

Indian-American Feminism and women's studies professor

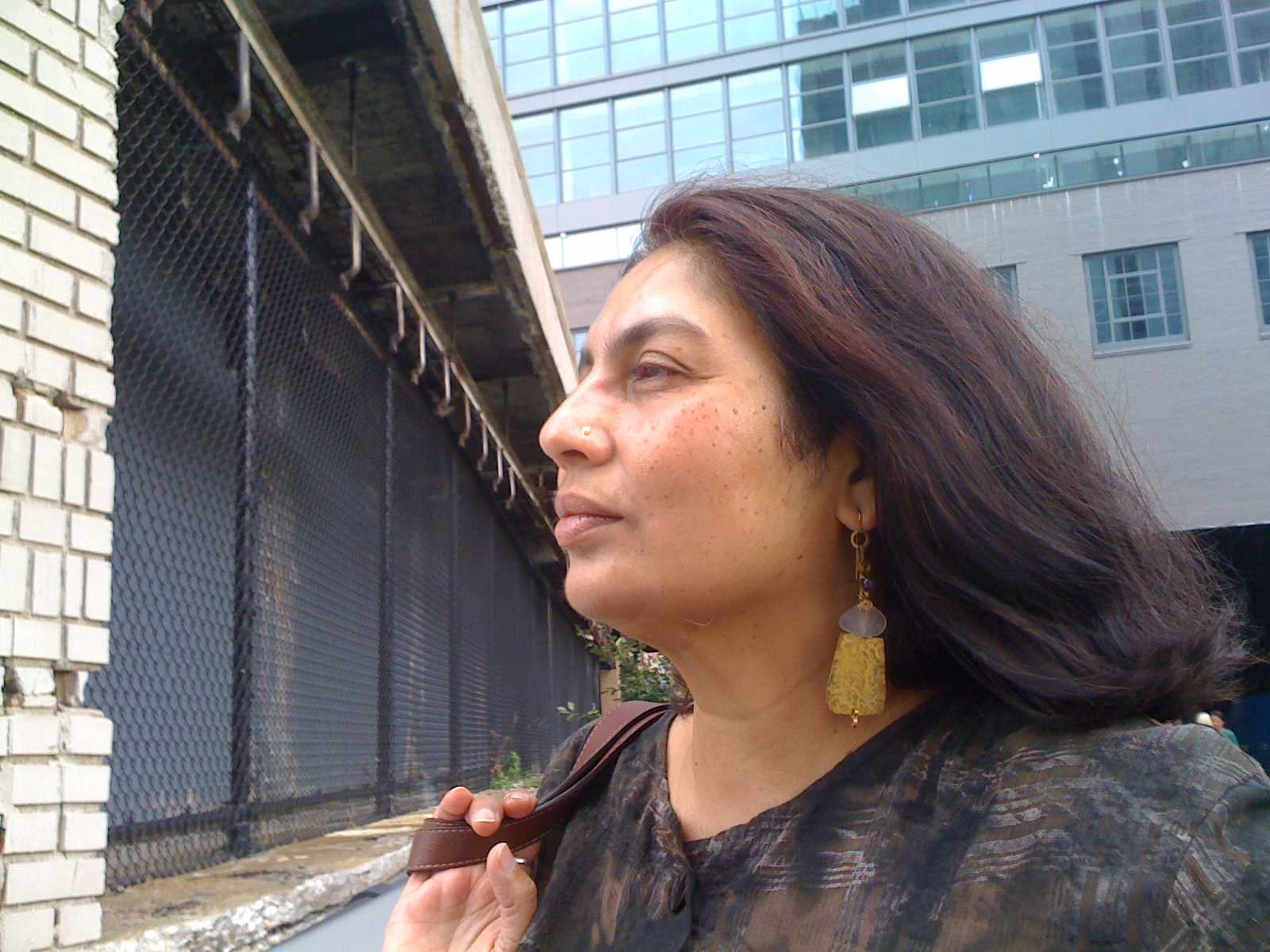
- Chandra Talpade Mohanty (2011) Self portrait of Chandra Mohanty
- Born: Chandra Talapade Mohanty; 1955 (age 70–71); Bombay, Bombay State (now Mumbai, Maharashtra), India

Academic background
- Education: University of Delhi; University of Illinois at Urbana-Champaign

Academic work
- Discipline: Women's Studies, Feminism
- Institutions: Oberlin College; Hamilton College; Syracuse University
- Notable works: Under Western eyes: Feminist scholarship and colonial discourses
- Website: Official Website

Chandra Talpade Mohanty (born 1955) is a Distinguished Professor of Women's and Gender Studies, Sociology, and the Cultural Foundations of Education and Dean's Professor of the Humanities at Syracuse University. Mohanty, a postcolonial and transnational feminist theorist, has argued for the inclusion of a transnational approach in exploring women’s experiences across the world. She is author of Feminism Without Borders: Decolonizing Theory, Practicing Solidarity (Duke University Press, 2003 and Zubaan Books, India, 2004; translated into Korean, 2005, Swedish, 2007, and Turkish, 2009, Japanese, 2012 and Italian, 2012), and co-editor of Third World Women and the Politics of Feminism (Indiana University Press, 1991), Feminist Genealogies, Colonial Legacies, Democratic Futures (Routledge, 1997), Feminism and War: Confronting U.S. Imperialism, (Zed Press, 2008), The Sage Handbook on Identities (coedited with Margaret Wetherell, 2010), and Feminist Freedom Warriors: Genealogies, Justice, Politics, and Hope (co-edited with Linda Carty, Haymarket Press, 2018).

Her work focuses on transnational feminist theory, anti-capitalist feminist praxis, anti-racist education, and the politics of knowledge. Central to Mohanty’s transnational mission is the project of building a "non-colonizing feminist solidarity across the borders," through an intersectional analysis of race, nation, colonialism, sexuality, class and gender.

== Early life and education ==
Chandra Talpade Mohanty was born in 1955, in present-day Mumbai, Maharashtra, India. She has spent time in Nigeria and London. She became a US citizen and continued her education in the United States.

Mohanty graduated in 1974 with honors and a Bachelor's degree in English from the University of Delhi in India. She continued her education, earning a Master's degree in English in 1976. She attended the University of Illinois at Urbana-Champaign, from where she earned a master's degree in Education, specifically in teaching English in 1980. She continued her education in Illinois, earning a Ph.D. from the University of Illinois at Urbana-Champaign in 1987. She is additionally the recipient of an Honorary Doctorate, Faculty of Social Sciences, Lund University Sweden, presented in 2008, and an Honorary Doctorate in humanities from the College of Wooster, Ohio, awarded in 2012. As of 2013, Mohanty has served as the women's studies department chair at Syracuse University. Earlier, she served as a professor of women's studies at Oberlin College in Oberlin, Ohio and Hamilton College in Clinton, New York.

She is a member of the advisory boards of the Centre for Feminist Foreign Policy, Center for Intersectional Justice, Signs: Journal of Women in Culture and Society, Transformations, The Journal of Inclusive Pedagogy and Scholarship, Feminist Africa (South Africa), Asian Women (Korea), Feminist Economics, and the Caribbean Review of Gender Studies.

== Overview of major works ==
She became known after the publication of her 1984 essay, "Under Western Eyes: Feminist Scholarship and Colonial Discourses", in which she states,

The relationship between 'Woman'—a cultural and ideological composite Other constructed through diverse representational discourses (scientific, literary, juridical, linguistic, cinematic, etc.)—and 'women'—real, material subjects of their collective histories—is one of the central questions the practice of feminist scholarship seeks to address."

In this essay, Mohanty critiques the political project of Western feminism and its discursive construction of the category of the "Third World woman" as a generic, homogenous, victimized stereotype that Western feminists must save. Mohanty states that Western feminisms have tended to gloss over the differences between Southern women, but that the experience of oppression is incredibly diverse, and contingent upon historical, cultural, and individual reasons. Her paper was a key work, highlighting the difficulties faced by feminists from the Third World in being heard within the broader feminist movement, and it led to a "redefining of power relationships" between feminists within the First and Third worlds.

In 2003, Mohanty released her book Feminism Without Borders: Decolonizing Theory, Practicing Solidarity. In this work, she argues for a bridging of theory and praxis, and the personal and the political. Major themes addressed include the politics of difference, transnational solidarity building, and anticapitalist struggle against neoliberal globalization. As well as reprinting "Under Western Eyes", in the final section, "Reorienting Feminism", Mohanty offers a response to criticism of the essay, and "reiterates her belief in the possibility, indeed necessity, of building common political projects between Third World and Western feminisms".

== Selected publications ==
- Mohanty, Chandra Talpade; Russo, Anne; and Lourdes M. Torres (1991). Third World Women and the Politics of Feminism, Indiana University Press, 338 pages. ISBN 978-0253206329
- Mohanty, Chandra Talpade; and M. Jacqui Alexander (1996). Feminist Genealogies, Colonial Legacies, Democratic Futures, Routledge Press, 464 pages. ISBN 978-0415912112
- Mohanty, Chandra Talpade (2003). Feminism Without Borders: Decolonizing Theory, Practicing Solidarity, Duke University Press Books, 300 pages. ISBN 978-0822330219
- Mohanty, Chandra Talpade; Riley, Robin L.; and Minnie Bruce Pratt (2008). Feminism and War: Confronting U.S. Imperialism, Zed Books, 280 pages. ISBN 978-1848130180
- Mohanty, Chandra Talpade; Wetherell, M. (2010). Sage Handbook of Identities, U.K: Sage Publications. ISBN 978-1412934114
- Carty, Linda E. and Mohanty, Chandra Talpade, editors (2018). Feminist Freedom Warriors: Genealogies, Justice, Politics, and Hope Haymarket Books, 200 pages. ISBN 978-1608468973

== See also ==
- Gayatri Chakravorty Spivak
- Postcolonial Feminism
- Postcolonialism
