= APA Award for Distinguished Contributions to the International Advancement of Psychology =

Award for Distinguished Contributions to the International Advancement of Psychology
- Description: Recognition for distinguished and enduring lifetime contributions to international cooperation and knowledge in psychology
- Country: United States
- Presented by: American Psychological Association (APA)

The American Psychological Association's Award for Distinguished Contributions to the International Advancement of Psychology is awarded for "distinguished and enduring lifetime contributions to the international cooperation and advancement of knowledge in psychology."

== Recipients ==
Source: APA

- 1991 Otto Klineberg
- 1992 Henry David
- 1993 Çigdem Kagitçibasi
- 1994 Frances Culbertson and Harry C. Triandis
- 1995 Paul B. Baltes and Wayne H. Holtzman
- 1996 Florence Denmark and Anthony J. Marsella
- 1997 Mark R. Rosenzweig
- 1998/1999 Edwin A. Fleishman
- 2000 Florence W. Kaslow and Juris G. Draguns
- 2002 Stanley C. Krippner
- 2003 Thomas D. Oakland
- 2004 Ronald P. Rohner
- 2005 Gary B. Melton and Charles D. Spielberger
- 2006 Michael Cole
- 2007 Ruben Ardila and Frederick T.L. Leong
- 2008 Puncky Paul Heppner
- 2009 Judith Torney-Purta
- 2010 Paul Pedersen
- 2011 Dan Olweus
- 2012 Fanny M. Cheung and Dan Landis
- 2013 Maria Cristina Richaud and Fons van de Vijver
- 2014 Saths Cooper
- 2015 Walter J. Lonner
- 2016 Héctor Fernández-Álvarez
- 2017 Mary P. Koss
- 2018 Mary Jane Rotheram-Borus
- 2019 Lawrence Gerstein
- 2020 Sharon Horne
- 2021 Kathleen Pike
- 2022 Klaus Boehnke
- 2023 Judith Gibbons
- 2024 Hector Betancourt
- 2025 Giuseppe Riva
- 2026 Ashley K. Randall

== See also ==
- List of psychology awards
- List of prizes named after people
