= John Culbertson =

John Culbertson may refer to:

- John Culbertson (economist), American professor of economics
- John Bolt Culbertson, member of the South Carolina House of Representatives
- John T. Culbertson Jr., Illinois lawyer and judge

== See also ==
- John Culberson, former member of the U.S. House of Representatives
