= Hyeouk Chris Hahm =

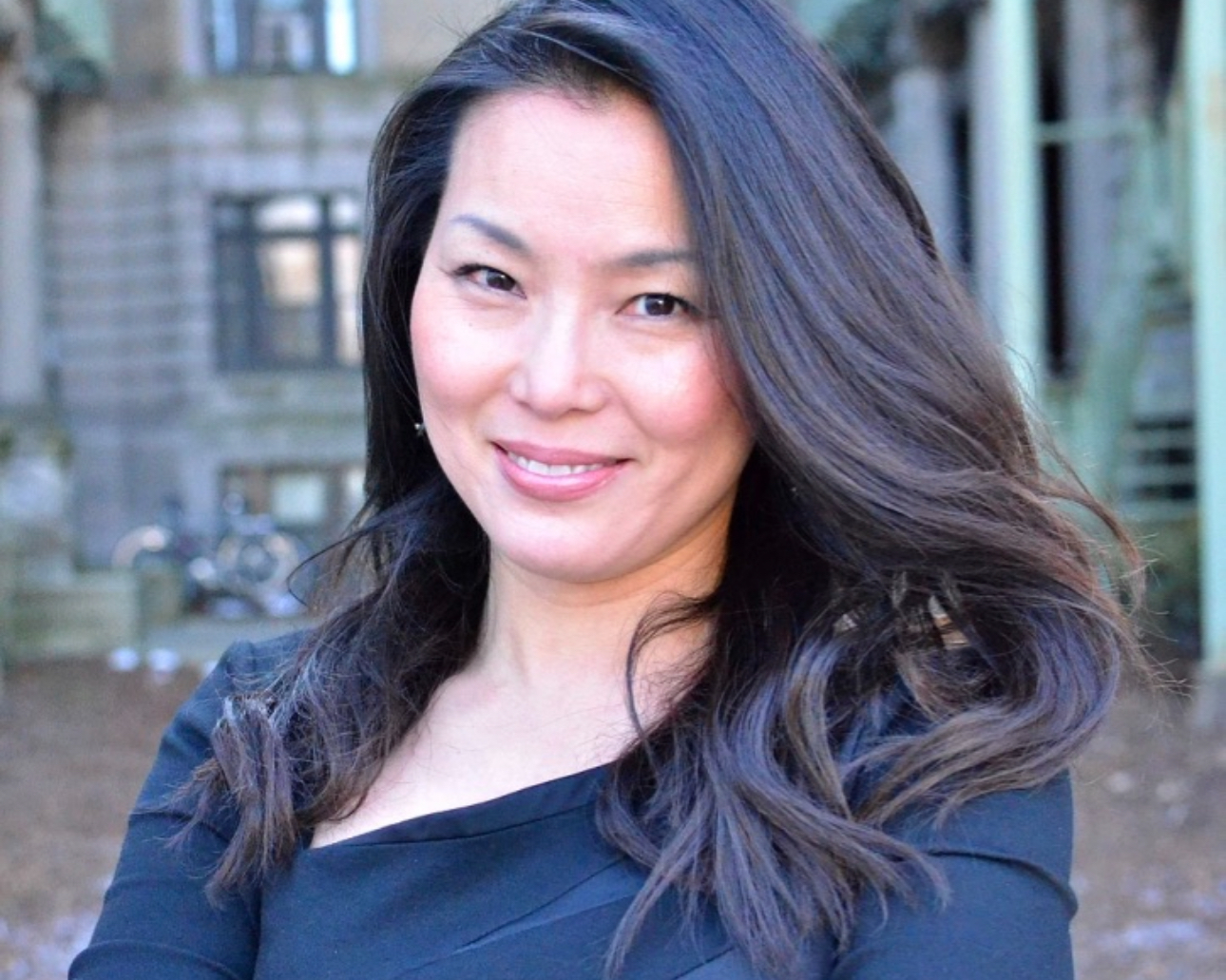
- Headshot of Professor and Researcher Chris Hahm
- Education: Columbia University
- Occupations: Professor of Social Work and Health Services Researcher
- Employer: Boston University School of Social Work
- Known for: Health Service Research
- Notable work: AWARE (Asian Women’s Action for Resilience and Empowerment)

Hyeouk Chris Hahm is an American health services professor and researcher. She is the associate dean of research at Boston University and the first Asian American faculty member to be promoted to full professor at the Boston University School of Social Work. She was elected vice president of the Society for Social Work and Research in 2024.

Her work specializes in health care for Asian American adolescents and people with mental illness. In 2016, she set up the Asian Women's Action for Resilience and Empowerment (AWARE), a culturally-informed group psychotherapy intervention for Asian American women. By integrating gender and culturally-specific elements, the AWARE Training Certificate Program aims to prepare social workers, mental health counselors, and educators to understand and empower Asian American women navigating challenging dynamics (CADER).

== Education ==
Hahm graduated from Seoul Women's University's School of Social Work]] with a bachelor’s degree and earned a master's degree and doctorate degree in Social Work from Columbia University School of Social Work. She completed a National Institute of Mental Health-funded postdoctoral fellowship in Public Health and Social Work at the University of California, Berkeley.

== Career ==
Hahm is a fellow and member of nominating committee of the Society for Social Work and Research (SSWR). Hahm is on the editorial board of the Journal of Youth and Adolescence and has published over 90 peer-reviewed articles. She co-edited a book, Asian American Parenting: Family Process and Intervention, in 2017. In 2020 and 2021, she was the Boston University School of Social Work's chair of social research.

During her sabbatical leave at Boston University, she was a visiting associate professor of psychiatry at the Center of Multicultural Mental Health Research at Cambridge Health Alliance, a Harvard Medical School-affiliated institution.

Hahm is active in spreading awareness to the general public, and has been invited as a panelist and presenter to various talks, both internationally and nationally. Her work has also been featured on major newspapers including the New York Times, Washington Post, USA Today, Boston Globe, The Economist, and radio including WBUR.

Hahm works on epidemiology, theory development, and intervention design/dissemination, with a specific focus on understanding depression, self-harm, and suicidal behaviors among immigrant children. Her primary research interests include acculturation, health risk behaviors (tobacco use, binge drinking, sexual activity), health care utilization among Asian-American adolescents and sexual minority populations and health care utilization among people with mental illness. She is a researcher and holds additional faculty affiliate roles at the Rutgers Center of Alcohol & Substance Use Studies at Rutgers University.

In 2021, Hahm became the first Asian American to be promoted to full professor at the Boston University School of Social Work. In 2024, Hahm was elected as vice president of the Society for Social Work and Research.

=== Asian American Women's Health Initiative Project ===
In 2009, Hahm set up the Asian American Women's Health Initiative Project (AWSHIP) at Boston University. AWSHIP was funded by the National Institute of Mental Health (NIMH) to investigate the mental health, sexual health, and substance use behaviors of Chinese American, Korean American, and Vietnamese American women. This project interviewed 600 Korean, Chinese, and Vietnamese women between the ages of 18–35, who are children of immigrants and live in the Boston area, focusing on factors including acculturation, family relations, depression, sexual risk behaviors, and gender inequities to determine their relation to the different subsets of personal health and risk behaviors. Since 2010, AWSHIP has published 17 journal articles and given over 60 presentations at both national and international conferences.

=== Asian Women’s Action for Resilience and Empowerment ===
Hahm set up the Boston University Asian Women's Action for Resilience and Empowerment (AWARE) lab, funded by the National Institute of Mental Health. AWARE provides culturally-grounded and trauma-informed psychotherapy intervention for Asian American women. Funded by a National Institutes of Health grant, Hahm launched the AWARE program at Wellesley College in 2016 and Harvard University in 2018, and developed AWARE online training courses supported by Digital Learning & Innovation at Boston University. The training program is part-group therapy session, part-research study, aiming to fulfill a need for mental health care for Asian American immigrants, an under-researched demographic. On September 13, 2017, Hahm published the AWARE program's Stage I Pilot Study in the Journal of Cross-Cultural Psychology. In 2020, Hahm worked on the COVID-19 Adult Resilience Experiences Study (CARES) to examine mandated relocation experiences related to self-reported worry, grief, loneliness, and depressive, generalized anxiety, and post-traumatic stress disorder (PTSD) symptoms among college students during the COVID-19 pandemic.

== Awards and honors ==
Hahm is a member of various boards and committees, including the Korean Reunification Advisory Board, Korean-American Scientists and Engineers Association, Harvard University Behavioral Health Center, and Asian Women for Health. In addition, she is a member and chair of the board of trustees in the diversity and unity committee and the school life committee at St. Sebastian’s School. She is a board member of the Maragin Health Foundation.

Hahm has received various awards during her career, including school-based awards such as the Outstanding Mentor Award at Boston University and research-based awards such as the Innovator's Award by Asian Women for Health. She has received special recognition from the National Institutes of Health as a Health Disparity Scholar.
