= Christian A. Meissner =

American psychologist

Christian A. Meissner is an American psychologist. He is a faculty member at Iowa State University.

== Education ==
Christian Meissner received his PhD With Major in Psychology at Florida State University in 2001. There, he was mentored by John C. Brigham. At FSU, he also completed his masters degree in Cognitive and Behavioral Science in 1999. He completed his bachelors degree at Pfeiffer University.

== Career ==
Christian Meissner is currently a psychology professor and director of graduate education at Iowa State University. He runs Iowa State's Cognition Lab, which focuses hands-on experimental research on how people think and process information, especially decision making. Some of the lab's most notable topics are interrogations, eyewitness identification, and applied memory.

== Awards ==
Meissner was recognized as a Fellow of the American Psychological Association's Division 41 in 2018. In 2023, he received the Gallagher Outstanding Mentorship Award by the National Postdoctoral Association for his empathetic and empowering mentorship strategies, as well as his leadership ability. The following year, in 2024, the American Association for the Advancement of Science elected him as a Fellow in the Section of Psychology affiliation in recognition of his advancements and efforts in service of society.

== Contributions to the field ==
=== Interrogations ===
One of Christian Meissner's most researched topics is interrogation techniques within law enforcement. In a collaboration with Melissa B. Russano and other researchers, Meissner conducted a research study examining the effectiveness of a new interrogation training model for law enforcement. This proposed model, which focuses on using an information-gathering approach, developing rapport and eliciting information from memory, was taught to law enforcement using lectures, active learning strategies and demonstrations. At the conclusion of their study, the researchers discussed how their proposed training model improved the rates at which law enforcement used the science-based interview approach.

=== Investigations ===
Along with interrogations, Meissner's research also centers on interviewing techniques. In 2021, Meissner and colleagues examined law enforcement's adoption of a rapport-based approach to investigative interviewing. Law enforcement investigators disclosed that they would be more likely to implement the rapport-based approach to interviews after their successful completion of the training module.

=== Eyewitness testimony ===
Meissner has conducted research in the field of eyewitness testimony throughout his career. His research aims to reduce wrongful convictions and improve reliability of memory-based evidence. A 2008 collaboration between Meissner and Steve Lane outlines a "middle road" approach to bridge the gap between memory research and applied forensic practice. This includes a focus on theory development and an emphasis on an interaction between field and laboratory research. Meissner has contributed to the development of training protocols for law enforcement. In a 2008 article Meissner and other researchers, such as Roy S. Malpass, provide ongoing recommendations for eyewitness memory and identification, arguing that open dialogue between eyewitness researchers and law enforcement agencies can ensure the most up-to-date information and the correct procedures that should be used.

In 2020, Meissner was selected to co-author a white paper for the American Psychology-Law Association, outlining evidence-based policy recommendations for eyewitness testimony. These nine recommendations focus on proper witness instructions, evidence-based suspicion, and a collection of confidence statements. Meissner and his colleagues conclude that the reliability and integrity of eyewitness identification evidence relies on law enforcement procedures for collecting and protecting the eyewitness evidence.
