= Eric D. Wittkower =

German-born British-Canadian psychiatrist (1899–1983)

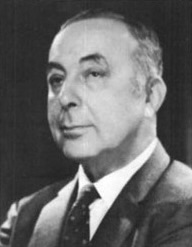
- Born: Eric David Wittkower; April 4, 1899; Berlin, Germany
- Died: January 6, 1983 (aged 83); Montreal, Quebec, Canada
- Known for: Transcultural psychiatry; psychosomatic medicine
- Spouse: Claire Weil (m. 1931; died. 2009)
- Children: 2
- Scientific career
- Fields: Psychiatry, psychoanalysis, psychosomatic medicine

Eric David Wittkower (April 4, 1899 – January 6, 1983) was a German-born British-Canadian psychiatrist, psychoanalyst, and psychosomatic researcher. He is regarded as a major figure in postwar psychiatry and a pioneer in the development of transcultural psychiatry.

== Early life and education ==
Wittkower was born in Berlin, Germany on April 4, 1899, the son of Louis Israel Wittkower and Bertha Blume Katz. He studied medicine at the University of Berlin, where he trained in internal medicine before later specialising in psychiatry and psychoanalysis.

Early in his career, he conducted research in psychosomatic medicine, focusing on the relationship between psychological processes and physical illness.

== Career ==
Following the rise of the Nazi regime in 1933, Wittkower emigrated from Germany, first relocating to Switzerland and later to the United Kingdom.

In the United Kingdom, he continued his work in psychosomatic medicine and trained as a psychoanalyst. During World War II, he served in the British Army, contributing to psychiatric evaluation and officer selection procedures.

After approximately two decades in Britain, Wittkower emigrated to Canada in 1951, where he joined McGill University in Montreal. There, he became a professor of psychiatry and played a central role in shaping psychiatric research and education.

In 1955, he founded the Transcultural Psychiatry Research Unit at McGill University, one of the first academic centers dedicated to the study of cultural influences on mental health.

In 1956, he initiated one of the first international newsletters in the field, helping to disseminate research and establish global networks in transcultural psychiatry.

== Contributions ==
Wittkower made significant contributions to psychosomatic medicine, emphasising the interaction between psychological and physiological processes in illness.

He is widely regarded as a pioneer of transcultural psychology. His work conceptualised culture as an environmental factor influencing the manifestation of illness, proposing that mental disorders may present differently across cultural contexts.

At McGill University, he helped establish transcultural psychiatry as an interdisciplinary field, integrating psychiatry with anthropology and social sciences and fostering international research networks.

He also contributed to the institutional development of psychiatry, including co-founding the Canadian Psychoanalytic Society.

== Legacy ==
Wittkower is considered a foundational figure in the emergence of transcultural psychiatry in the postwar period. His work contributed to the global development of culturally informed approaches to mental health and influenced subsequent research on cross-cultural psychiatry.

== Personal life ==
Wittkower married Claire Francesca Weil in 1931. Weil died in 2009. The couple had children.

== Death ==
He died on January 6, 1983, in Montreal, Quebec, Canada.
