= Rohner =

Rohner is a surname. Notable people with the surname include:

- Clayton Rohner (born 1957), American actor
- Gebhard Rohner (1836–1908), Swiss politician
- Gerhard Rohner (1895–1971), German politician
- Joop Rohner (1927–2005), Dutch water polo player
- Marcel Rohner (banker) (born 1964), Swiss businessman, former Chairman and CEO of UBS AG
- Marcel Rohner (bobsledder) (born 1964), Swiss bobsledder
- Marshall Rohner (1963–2005), American guitarist
- Ronald P. Rohner (born 1935), American psychologist
- Urs Rohner (born c.1959), Swiss lawyer, businessman and banker
