= Social philosophy =

Ethical analysis of social phenomena

Social philosophy is the study and interpretation of society and social institutions in terms of ethical values rather than empirical relations. Social philosophers emphasize understanding the social contexts for political, legal, moral and cultural questions, and the development of novel theoretical frameworks, from social ontology to care ethics to cosmopolitan theories of democracy, natural law, human rights, gender equity and global justice.

== Subdisciplines ==
There is often a considerable overlap between the questions addressed by social philosophy and ethics or value theory. Other forms of social philosophy include political philosophy and jurisprudence, which are largely concerned with the societies of state and government and their functioning.

Social philosophy, ethics, and political philosophy all share intimate connections with other disciplines in the social sciences and the humanities. In turn, the social sciences themselves are of focal interest to the philosophy of social science.'

In his book, What is Political Philosophy, Leo Strauss made distinctions between social and political philosophy. Both fields of philosophy center around essentially the same subject, but social philosophy takes those questions from the broader view of "society".

Social philosophy is broadly interdisciplinary, looking at all of phenomenology, epistemology, and philosophy of language from a sociological perspective; phenomenological sociology, social epistemology and sociology of language respectively.

== Relevant topics ==
Some social philosophy is concerned with identity, and defining strata that categorize society, for example race and gender. Other social philosophy examines agency and free will, and whether people socialized in a particular way are accountable for their actions.

=== Issues addressed by social philosophy ===
- Conflict theory
- Racism
- Critical theory
- Deviancy
- Social justice
- Social inequality
- Social class
- Social phenomenology
- Structural violence
- Structure and agency

== See also ==
- Anomie
- Biosocial criminology
- Critical legal studies
- Critical race theory
- Cross-cultural studies
- Culture war
- Decolonization of knowledge
- Economic inequality
- Feminist theory
- Gender studies
- Identity politics
- Marxist humanism
- Secular morality
- Social anthropology
- Social Axioms Survey
- Social psychology
- Social vulnerability
- Sociology of race and ethnic relations
- World Values Survey
