= Roy S. Malpass =

American social psychologist

- Occupations: Educator, Researcher, Psychologist

Academic background
- Education: B.S. (1959), M.A. (1961), Ph.D. (1968)
- Alma mater: Syracuse University

Academic work
- Discipline: Social Psychologist
- Sub-discipline: Eyewitness Identification and Facial Recognition
- Institutions: Professor Emeritus at UTEP & SUNY Plattsburgh

Roy S. Malpass is a social psychologist known for his research in facial recognition and eyewitness identification. He is a Professor Emeritus of Psychology at the University of Texas at El Paso and the State University of New York at Plattsburgh.

== Education ==
Malpass first got his Bachelors of Science degree (1959) at Union College in Schenectady, New York. He went on to get his Masters of Arts degree (1961) at The Graduate Faculty, The New School for Social Research in New York, New York. Then, Malpass went on to get his Ph.D. (1968) at Syracuse University in Syracuse, New York. Malpass completed his dissertation for Syracuse University and his topic was, Effects of Attitude on Learning and Memory: The Influence of Instruction-Induced Sets.

== Career ==
After obtaining his M.A., Malpass became a research assistant at the Research Foundation Children’s Hospital in the District of Columbia until 1962. Soon after, he became a lecturer of psychology at Mount Allison University in Sackville, New Brunswick, Canada. Throughout his teaching career, Malpass taught multiple courses. A few being: cross-cultural research methods, psychology and culture, psychology and law, and wrongful conviction. In 1965, Malpass became a National Defense Education Act Title IV Fellow at Syracuse University. The NDEA was passed to help gain more qualified college teachers. In turn, of teaching, they would be able to study full time in the doctoral program. It is here, Syracuse, that Malpass would also obtain his Ph.D. in 1968. After that, he became an Assistant Professor of Psychology at the University of Illinois in Champaign-Urbana. In 1973, he continued his career as an educator and became the Associate Professor of Behavioral Science at the College of Arts & Sciences, SUNY at Plattsburgh. Later on, in 1980, he would obtain the title of Professor of Behavioral Science there and would also gain the title of Professor Emeritus in 1992. During those years, Malpass held the title of president at the Society for Cross-Cultural Research and the International Association for Cross-Cultural Psychology. In the coming moths of 1992, Malpass continued on to become the Director of the Criminal Justice Program, at the University of Texas at El Paso. Later, until 2007, Malpass would be the Head of the Ph.D. Program for the Department of Psychology. Finally, in 2011, he would gain the title Professor Emeritus at the University of Texas at El Paso.

== Awards ==
At the University of Illinois, Malpass received the Graduate Student Association Award in 1973. He was given this award for excellence in teaching and contributing to graduate education. Malpass received the Chancellor's Award in 1982, for excellent teaching. In 2011, Malpass received the Distinguished Achievement Award for Research at the University of Texas at El Paso.

== Research ==
Throughout his research, Malpass highly focuses on eyewitness identification and facial recognition. Some of his most cited works are about eyewitness identification procedures. Closely following are his works about facial recognition among race. Malpass frequently publishes works within the topic of police lineups, where he has collaborated with Dawn Mcquiston. His research has shown that not receiving a correct identification can be played off as guessing, when there is no support to show it. When it comes to facial recognition works he frequently collaborates with Otto H. Maclin. His research has shown that people are more able to identify others of their own race, by face, than those of another race. Since starting his career, Malpass has published or helped with at least 139 journals.

== Books ==
- Lonner, Walter J., Malpass, Roy S. (1993). Psychology and Culture. MA: Allyn and Bacon. 0205148999.
- Sporer, Siegfried L., Malpass, Roy S., Koehnken, Guenter (1996). Psychological Issues in Eyewitness Identification. Mahwah, NJ: Lawrence Erlbaum Associates. 0805811982.
