= Maria Cristina Richaud =

María Cristina Richaud (also known as María Cristina Richaud de Minzi) is an Argentine psychologist and researcher.

She was born and raised in Buenos Aires. In 1959 she was one of the first 25 female students to enter the Colegio Nacional de Buenos Aires, until then an all-male institution; she graduated in 1964. She received her degree in psychology from the University of Buenos Aires in 1970 and earned a doctorate in philosophy and letters with a specialization in cognitive psychology from the same university in 1983.

She joined the research career of the National Scientific and Technical Research Council (CONICET) in 1976 as an Assistant Researcher, reaching the rank of Senior Researcher in 2008. She was a student of Horacio Rimoldi and worked within the academic tradition associated with Nuria Cortada de Kohan.

Richaud was a founding member, vice-president and later president of the Argentine Association of Behavioral Sciences, and represented Argentina at the biennial assemblies of the International Union of Psychological Science (IUPsyS). In 1980 she co-founded, with Rimoldi, the journal Interdisciplinaria: Revista de Psicología y Ciencias Afines, of which she is an editor. She directed the Interdisciplinary Center for Research in Mathematical and Experimental Psychology (CIIPME-CONICET) from 2001 to 2016, and directed the Doctorate in Psychology at the Pontifical Catholic University of Argentina from 2008 to 2019.

She later worked as a researcher at the Institute of Family Sciences of Austral University, as emeritus researcher at the Adventist University of the Plata, and as scientific advisor of that university's Interdisciplinary Center for Research in Health and Behavioral Sciences (CIICSAC). She also advised the master's program in psychodiagnosis and psychological evaluation at the Faculty of Psychology of the University of Buenos Aires and was an honorary professor at the University of El Salvador.

Her research focused on developmental psychology, psychometrics and cognitive psychology, with particular attention to socio-emotional and cognitive development, attachment, empathy and prosocial behavior in children and adolescents, and to childhood in situations of social vulnerability due to poverty. She developed instruments to assess coping, parenting styles, empathy and self-efficacy in children and adolescents, and designed intervention programs to strengthen socio-emotional and cognitive resources in socially vulnerable children. She has published more than 140 articles in scientific journals, along with book chapters and books.

Her distinctions include the Bernardo Houssay Award for Scientific and Technological Research (2005), in the Consolidated Researcher category of the Human and Social Sciences area, the first time it was granted to a psychologist; the Rubén Ardila Award for Scientific Research in Psychology (2009); the APA Award for Distinguished Contributions to the International Advancement of Psychology (2013), shared with Fons van de Vijver; the "Carlo Molinari Marotto" award of the Association for the Advancement of Psychological Science (2014); and recognition as a Distinguished Personality during the bicentennial of the University of Buenos Aires (2021). In 2017, a research project she directed received an award from the Argentine Committee for Health Education of the Population (CAESPO), and in 2020 a study she co-authored on the mental health of health workers during the COVID-19 pandemic received an honorable mention in the Interamerican Society of Psychology's "Isabel Reyes Lagunes" Award.
