= Çiğdem Kağıtçıbaşı =

Turkish social psychologist

- Born: 29 January 1940; Bursa, Turkey
- Died: 2 March 2017 (aged 77)
- Education: American College for Girls
- Alma mater: Wellesley College (BA); University of California, Berkeley (PhD)
- Awards: APA Award for Distinguished Contributions to the International Advancement of Psychology (1993)
- Scientific career
- Institutions: Middle East Technical University; Boğaziçi University; Koç University

Çiğdem Kağıtçıbaşı (29 January 1940 – 2 March 2017) was a Turkish scientist and professor. She was a university professor since 1969 and received the APA Award for Distinguished Contributions to the International Advancement of Psychology in 1993.

== Early life and education ==
Çiğdem Kağıtçıbaşı was born in Bursa, Turkey on 29 January 1940. In 1959, she completed high school at American College for Girls in Istanbul before moving to the United States for her post-secondary studies. In the US, Kağıtçıbaşı completed a bachelor's degree at Wellesley College in 1961 and a Doctor of Philosophy at the University of California, Berkeley in 1967 specializing in social psychology.

== Career ==
Kağıtçıbaşı began teaching at the Middle East Technical University in 1969 before moving on to Boğaziçi University in 1974. She taught at Boğaziçi until 1995 when she began working at Koç University. At Koç University, she was a social science dean from 1998 to 2001 and later became the university's gender studies director in 2010. As a social scientist, Kağıtçıbaşı participated in research focusing on determining the reasons why young adults want to start a family. Outside of her scientific career, Kağıtçıbaşı held various positions including vice president of the International Union of Psychological Science from 1996 to 2000 and the International Social Science Council from 2004 to 2006.

Kağıtçıbaşı authored the widely cited book Family and Human Development across Cultures: A View from the Other Side in 1996, which challenged culture-bound models of human development based on European-American psychological research while offering a dynamic systems perspective on human, social, and cultural development. A second volume Family, Self, and Human Development Across Cultures: Theory and Applications, was published in 2007, which offered a family change theory of how modernization in non-Western societies impacts family structure. Kağıtçıbaşı served as co-editor of the 1994 volume Individualism and Collectivism: Theory, Method, and Applications. She was one of the founders of AÇEV (Anne Çocuk Eğitim Vakfı/Mother-Child Education Foundation) and first mothers, then also fathers received support to become better parents from this foundation wherein the framework was based on Kağıtçıbaşı’s research studies on early child development.

== Selected articles ==
- Kağıtçıbaşı, C. (1996). The autonomous-relational self. European Psychologist, 1(3), 180–186.
- Kağıtçıbaşı, C. (2005). Autonomy and relatedness in cultural context: Implications for self and family. Journal of Cross-Cultural Psychology, 36(4), 403–422.
- Kağıtçıbaşı, C., & Berry, J. W. (1989). Cross-cultural psychology: Current research and trends. Annual Review of Psychology, 40(1), 493–531.

== Awards and honors ==
In 1993, Kağıtçıbaşı received the APA Award for Distinguished Contributions to the International Advancement of Psychology. Other awards include a fellowship at the International Association of Applied Psychology and Netherlands Institute for Advanced Study.

== Death ==
Kağıtçıbaşı died on 2 March 2017.
