= Sharon Horne (psychologist) =

LGBTQ researcher and scientist

- Occupations: Research Scientist and Psychologist Involved in LGBTQ Mental Health
- Awards: International Council of Psychologists Denmark-Gunvald Award for Feminist Research and Service, Elizabeth Hurlock Beckman Award, Excellent Contribution Award for Scholarship in the Area of International Counseling Psychology, Florence L. Denmark and Benjamin Wolman Award for Significant Contributions in Psychology, Award for Significant Contribution to Social Justice & Advocacy from the Society of Counseling Psychology of the American Psychological Association, APA Award for Distinguished Contributions to the International Advancement of Psychology

Academic background
- Education: Indiana University Bloomington; University of Georgia

Academic work
- Institutions: University of Massachusetts Boston

Sharon Horne is a social scientist known for conducting research on LGBTQ issues, mental health and college student development, and international psychology concerns. Horne is Professor of Counseling Psychology and the Director of Training for the American Psychological Association Accredited Counseling Psychology Ph.D. Program at the University of Massachusetts Boston. She was a representative to the APA International Psychology Network for Lesbian, Gay, Bisexual, Transgender and Intersex Issues (IPsyNet) from 2013 to 2022, and chaired the policy committee that drafted the IpsyNet Statement and Commitment on LGBTI Concerns. As of today, the IpsyNet Statement and Commitment on LGBTI Concerns has been endorsed by 43 national and international psychology organizations and translated into 13 languages.

== Biography ==
Horne received her dual Bachelor of Arts in Slavic Languages and Literature, and Journalism from Indiana University Bloomington in 1987. She also received a Certificate of Study in Slavic and Eastern European studies from Indiana University. Horne then attended the Pushkin Institute for a year in Moscow, Russia, where she studied Russian language. Following that, she served in the Peace Corps in Niger, West Africa. She attended graduate school at the University of Georgia, where she received her master's degree in Counseling in 1994 and a Ph.D. in Counseling Psychology in 1998. She completed her pre-doctoral internship at the Veterans Affairs Administration in Seattle.

== Research ==
Since 1999, Horne has directed a LGBT Concerns Research Team at University of Massachusetts Boston. She directs a team of doctoral, masters, and undergraduate students in research, advocacy, and training in GLBTQI health issues. Her team projects have included developing a training program for school professionals to increase competencies in working with GLBT and queer youth, a training video, and a research study on GLB youth experiences. Horne's research team additionally studies investigating experiences of religion and spirituality among GLBT adults, studies on same-sex relationships for men and women, the psychological impact of anti-GLBT messages and anti-GLBT policy initiatives on GLBT individuals, parents, and families of origin, GLBT HIV health related issues, racial and sexual minority for gay families, and the psychological impact of lack of legal rights for LGBT parents. This is Horne's main area of research.

In one of Horne's studies examining legal recognition of same-sex couple relationships, she found that participants in committed or legally recognized relationships reported less psychological distress and higher well-being than single participants. She used an online survey sample of 2,677 lesbian, gay, and bisexual individuals, and participants were placed in 4 groups: single, dating, in a committed relationship, and in a legally recognized relationship. Analyses revealed significant group differences, and multivariate analyses indicated that participants in a legally recognized relationship reported less internalized homophobia, fewer depressive symptoms, lower levels of stress, and more meaning in their lives than those in committed relationships, even after controlling for other factors.

Another study examined a survey of lesbian, gay, and bisexual adults who experienced minority and psychological distress following the 2006 general election in which the constitutional amendments were on the ballot in 9 states limiting marriage to one man and one woman. Following the November election, Horne found that participants living in states that passed a marriage amendment reported significantly more minority stress (i.e., exposure to negative media messages and negative conversations) and higher levels of psychological distress (negative affect, stress, and depressive symptoms) than participants living in the other states.

== Awards and honors ==
Horne has received awards for her contributions and research in psychology including the 2012 Elizabeth Hurlock Beckman award. This award recognizes teachers who inspire students to make a difference in their own communities. In 2013, Horne received the Excellent Contribution Award for Scholarship in the Area of International Counseling Psychology, granted by the Society of Counseling Psychology International Section, and received the Florence L. Denmark and Benjamin Wolman Award for Significant Contributions in Psychology awarded by The International Organization for the Study of Group Tensions and the Academic Division of the New York State Psychological Association. In 2016, she received the Award for Significant Contribution to Social Justice & Advocacy from the Society of Counseling Psychology of the American Psychological Association. Horne was named Honorary Professor for 2016–2017 at the American University of Central Asia where she gave the commencement address in Bishkek, Kyrgyzstan.

Additionally, Horne is the recipient of a Global Fulbright Scholarship for 2018–2023 on the role of psychology policies and guidelines on mental health access and treatment of sexually and gender diverse individuals in Colombia, South Africa and the Philippines. In 2020, Horne received the APA Award for Distinguished Contributions to the International Advancement of Psychology.

Sharon Horne is also in the progress of writing her own memoir, Memphis Baby: Overcoming reproductive injustice in the U.S. South.

== Representative publications ==
- Horne, S. G., Chaparro, R. A., & Yel, N. (2025). Cultural adaptation and validation of a Spanish-Language measure of therapist competency working with transgender clients in Colombia. International Journal of Transgender Health. doi:10.1080/26895269.2024.2447782
- Chickerella, R., Levitt, H.M., Bacigalupe, G., Horne, S.G., & Yel, N. (accepted). The head vs the heart: Comparing psychoeducation and emotion focused writing as ways for bi+ men to process biphobic experiences. Journal of Homosexuality. doi:10.1080/00918369.2025.2540367
- Maroney, M. R., Chickerella, R., Coombs, E., Levitt, H. M., & Horne, S. G. (2025). “These experiences also relate to my neurodiverse identity”: An intersectional understanding of heterosexist events among Autistic-LGBTQ+ individuals. Autism in Adulthood. https://doi.org/10.1089/aut.2024.0326
- Horne, S. G., & Rostosky, S. S. (2025). Implications for researchers, clinicians, and policymakers. In A. Randall & P. Lannutti, (Eds.), Experiences of Sexual Minority and Gender Diverse Individuals in Romantic Relationships: Heeding a Global Call (pp. 288–304). Cambridge University Press.
- Pitoňák, M., Čihák, M., & Horne, S. G. (2024). LGBT+ people’s vulnerability to suicide in Czechia: The role of minority stress-related factors in a high structural stigma context. Psychology of Sexual Orientation and Gender Diversity. https://doi.org/10.1037/sgd0000785 Winner of the Professor Vladimír Vondráček National Psychiatric Award, Prague, Czechia.
- Min, M., Chang, E., Coombs, E., Shinbine, D., Noh, H., Yi, H. J., Maroney, M. R., & Horne, S. G. (2024). “Between Losing My Family and Asserting My Identity”: Exploration of Korean LGBQ YouTubers’ experiences coming out to parents. Psychology and Sexuality, 16, 1, 314–329. https://doi.org/10.1080/19419899.2024.2429763.
- Leskinen, E., Horne, S.G., Ryan, W. S., & van der Toorn, J. (2024). The opportunities and limits of open science for LGBTIQ+ research. Journal of Social Issues, 1-22. doi:10.1111/josi.12636
- van der Toorn, J., Bracco, S. E., Gaitho, W., Ryan, W. S., Horne, S. G., Anderson, J. R., & Leskinen. E. A. (2024). Inclusion and protection in tension: Reflections on gathering sexual orientation and gender identity data in the workplace. Journal of Social Issues, 1-26. doi:10.1111/josi.12632
- Maroney, M.R., Levitt, H.M., & Horne, S.G. (2023). Exploring the efficacy of an online therapy intervention in processing experiences of heterosexism among autistic-LGBQ adults. Journal of Autism and Developmental Disorders, 54, 2946 2959. https://doi.org/10.1007/s10803-023-06027-1
- Maroney, M. R., & Horne, S. G. (2022). “Tuned into a different channel”: Autistic transgender adults’ experiences of intersectional stigma. Journal of Counseling Psychology. https://doi.org/10.1037/cou0000639 (The editor of Journal of Counseling Psychology selected as an Editor’s Choice selection).
- Horne, S.G., *McGinley, M., Yel, N., & *Maroney, M.R. (2022). The stench of bathroom bills and anti-transgender legislation: Referendum-related anxiety and depression among transgender, nonbinary and cisgender LGBQ people. Journal of Counseling Psychology, 69(1), 1-13. doi: 10.1037/cou0000558
- Rachel Chickerella & Sharon G. Horne (2022): Sexual Health, but what else? A critical review of the literature focused on bisexual men in the United States. Journal of Bisexuality, 22(1), 30- 70. doi: 10.1080/15299716.2022.2028210
- Horne, S. G., & *McGinley, M. (2022). A global export, a local commodity: SOCE/GICE in international contexts. In D. Haldeman & M. Hendricks (Eds.), The Case Against Conversion Therapy. American Psychological Association.
- Horne, S.G., *Johnson, T., Yel, N., *Maroney, M. R., & *McGinley, M. (2021). Unequal rights between LGBTQ Parents living in the U.S.: The association of minority stress to relationship satisfaction and parental stress. Couple and Family Psychology: Research and Practice, 11(2), 141-160. doi: https://doi.org/10.1037/cfp0000192
- Schuyler, S., Chickerella, R., Mullin, N., Schmid, B., & Horne, S.G. (2021) Is it worth it? A grounded theory analysis of navigating the decision to come out as bisexual. Journal of Bisexuality, 21(4), 425-445. doi: 10.1080/15299716.2021.2004482
- Chickerella, R., *McGinley, M., *Schuyler, S., Horne, S. G., Yel, N., & *Whitehouse, A. (2021). Janelle Monáe vs. Katy Perry: Depiction of bi+ identities sexuality and relationship to depression and stigma. Journal of Bisexuality, 21(1), 71-93. doi:10.1080/15299716.2021.1874586
- Horne, S. G. (2020). The challenges and promises of transnational LGBTQ psychology: Somewhere over and under the rainbow. American Psychologist, 75(9), 1358–1371. doi:10.1037/amp0000791
- Maroney, M. R., Horne, S. G., *Wadler, B. M., *Emerson, H. (2020). Wise as a serpent and soft as a dove: Strategies of LGBT+ activists in the South. In K. K. Strunk & R. Feizali (Eds.) Queering the Deep South (pp., 191-212). Research in Queer Studies: Information Age Publishing.
- Horne, S. G., & Manalastas, E. (2020). Psychology and the global human rights agenda on sexual orientation and gender identity. In N. Rubin & R. Flores (Eds.), The Cambridge Handbook of Psychology and Human Rights*. Cambridge, U.K.: Cambridge University Press. *Book Finalist for the PROSE Award presented by the Association of American Publishers Awards for Professional and Scholarly Excellence. *Recipient of the 2021 APA Division of International Psychology Ursula Gielen Book Award
- Horne, S. G., Maroney, M. R., Nel, J. A., Chaparro, R. A., & Manalastas, E. J. (2019). Emergence of a transnational LGBTI psychology: Commonalities and challenges in advocacy and activism. American Psychologist, 74(8), 967–986. https://doi.org/10.1037/amp0000561
- Kosterina, E., Horne, S.G., & Lamb, S. (2019). The role of gender-based violence, health worries, and ambivalent sexism in the development of women’s gynecological symptoms. Journal of Health Psychology, 1-13. doi: 10.117/135910531882592
- Horne, S. G., & *White, L. (2019). The return of repression: Mental health concerns of Lesbian, Gay, Bisexual, and Transgender People in Russia. In N. Nakamura & C. H. Logie (Eds.), LGBTQ Mental Health: International Perspectives and Experiences (pp. 75–88). Washington, DC: American Psychological Association.
- Leach, M., & Horne, S. G., (2019). Ethical issues in international research. In M. Leach & E. R.Welfel (Eds.), The Cambridge Handbook of Applied Psychological Ethics (pp. 493–510). Cambridge, U.K.: Cambridge University Press.
- Freeman-Coppadge, D., & Horne, S. G. (2019). “What happens if the cross falls and crushes me?” Psychological and spiritual promises and perils of lesbian and gay Christian celibacy Psychology of Sexual Orientation and Gender Diversity, 6(4), 486–497. doi: 10.1037/sgd0000341
- Puckett, J. A., Mereish, E. H., Ethan, H., Levitt, H. M., Horne, S. G., & Hayes-Skelton, S. A. (2018). Internalized heterosexism and psychological distress: The moderating effects of decentering. Stigma and Health, 3, 1, 3-19. doi:10.1037/sah0000065
- Boyraz, G., Horne, S. G., & Granda, R. (2017). Depressive symptomatology and academic achievement among first-year college students: The role of effort regulation. Journal of College Student Development, 58, 8, 1218-1236. doi: 10.1353/csd.2017.0095
- Horne, S.G. (Ed.). (2017). Psychology of sexual and gender identity in Russia. [Special Issue]. Psychology in Russia: State of the Art, 10, 2, 1-148. Retrieved from http://psychologyinrussia.com/volumes/10_2_2017.php
- Horne, S. G., *Maroney, M.R., *Geiss, M., & *Dunnavant, B. (2017). The reliability and validity of a Russian version of the Lesbian Internalized Homophobia Scale. Psychology in Russia: State of the Art, 10, 2, 5-20. doi: 10.11621/pir.2017.0201
- Horne, S. G., *Maroney, M., Zagryazhskaya, E., & *Koven, J. (2017). Attitudes towards Gay and Lesbian individuals in Russia: An exploration of the interpersonal contact hypothesis and personality factors. Psychology in Russia: State of the Art, 10, 2, 21-34. doi:10.11621/pir.2017.0202
- Molchanova, E., Horne, S. G., Kim, E., & Yarova, O. (2017). Hybridized indigenous healing in the Kyrgyz Republic: Helping survivors of violence. Women & Therapy. doi:10.1080/02703149.2017.1324187
- Wheeler, E., Horne, S. G., *Maroney, M., & Johnson, T. (2018). Everything we can do: A content analysis of the protective strategies of same-sex parents. Journal of GLBT Family Studies, 14, 3, 196-212. doi: 10.1080/1550428X.2017.1325812
- Levitt, H. M., Horne, S. G., *Freeman-Coppadge, D., *Roberts, T. (2017). HIV prevention in gay family and house networks: Fostering self-determination and sexual safety (advanced online). AIDS & Behavior, 21,10, 2973-2986. doi: 10.1007/s10461-017-1774-x
- Puckett, J. A., *Surace, F., Levitt, H. M., & Horne, S. G. (2016). Sexual orientation identity in relation to minority stress and mental health of sexual minority women. LGBT Health, 3 (5), 350-356. doi:10.1089/lgbt.2015.0088
- Puckett, J. A., *Maroney, M., Levitt, H. M., & Horne, S. G. (2016). Relations between gender expression, minority stress, and mental health in cisgender sexual minority women and men. Psychology of Sexual Orientation and Gender Diversity, 3(4),489-498. doi: http://dx.doi.org/10.1037/sgd0000201
- Puckett, J., Horne, S. G., *Herbitter, C., *Maroney, M., & Levitt, H. M. (2017). Differences across contexts: Minority stress and interpersonal relationships for Lesbian, Gay, and Bisexual Women. Psychology of Women Quarterly, 41, 1, 8-19. doi:10.1177/0361684316655964 (2017 Babladelis Award Recipient)
- Puckett, J. A., Horne, S. G., *Surace, F., Carter, A., *Noffsinger-Frazier, N., *Shulman, J., *Detrie, P., *Ervin, A., & *Mosher, C. (2017). Predictors of sexual minority youth's reported suicide attempts and mental health. Journal of Homosexuality, 64 (6), 697-715. doi:10.1080/00918369.2016.1196999
- Boyraz, G., Horne, S. G., *Owens, A., & *Armstrong, A. (2016). Depressive symptomatology and college persistence among African American college students. Journal of General Psychology, 143, 2, 144-160. doi: 10.1080/00221309.2016.1163251
- Levitt, H. M., Horne, S. G., *Herbitter, C., *Johnson, T., *Ippolito, M., *Dunnavant, B., *Geiss, M., *Baggett, L., *Maxwell, D. (2016). Resilience in the face of sexual minority stress: “Choices” between authenticity and self-determination. Journal of Gay & Lesbian Social Services, 28, 1, 67-91. doi: 10.1080/10538720.2016.1126212
- Puckett. J. A., Levitt, H. M., Horne, S. G., & Hayes-Skelton, S. A. (2016). Internalized heterosexism and psychological distress: The mediating roles of self-criticism and community connectedness. Psychology of Sexual Orientation and Gender Diversity, 2, 426-435. doi: http://dx.doi.org/10.1037/sgd0000123
- Levitt, H. M., Horne, S. G., *Puckett, J. C., *Sweeney, K. K. & *Hampton, M. (2015). Gay families: Challenging racial and sexual/gender minority stressors through social support. Journal of GLBT Family Studies, 11, 1-30. doi: 10.1080/1550428X.2014.958266
- Boyraz, G., Horne, S. G., *Armstrong, A. C., & *Owens, A. (2014). Managing traumatic events and symptoms at college: The moderating effects of gender and race on depression and social support. Psychological Trauma: Theory, Research, Practice, & Policy, 7(3):259-268. doi: http://dx.doi.org/10.1037/a0037967
- Horne, S. G., Levitt, H. M., *Sweeney, K. K., *Puckett, J. C., & *Hampton, M. (2014). African American gay families: An entry point for HIV prevention. Journal of Sex Research, 3, 1-14. doi: 10.1080/00224499.2014.901285
