= Thomas Oakland =

American psychologist (1939–2015)

Dr. Thomas David Oakland
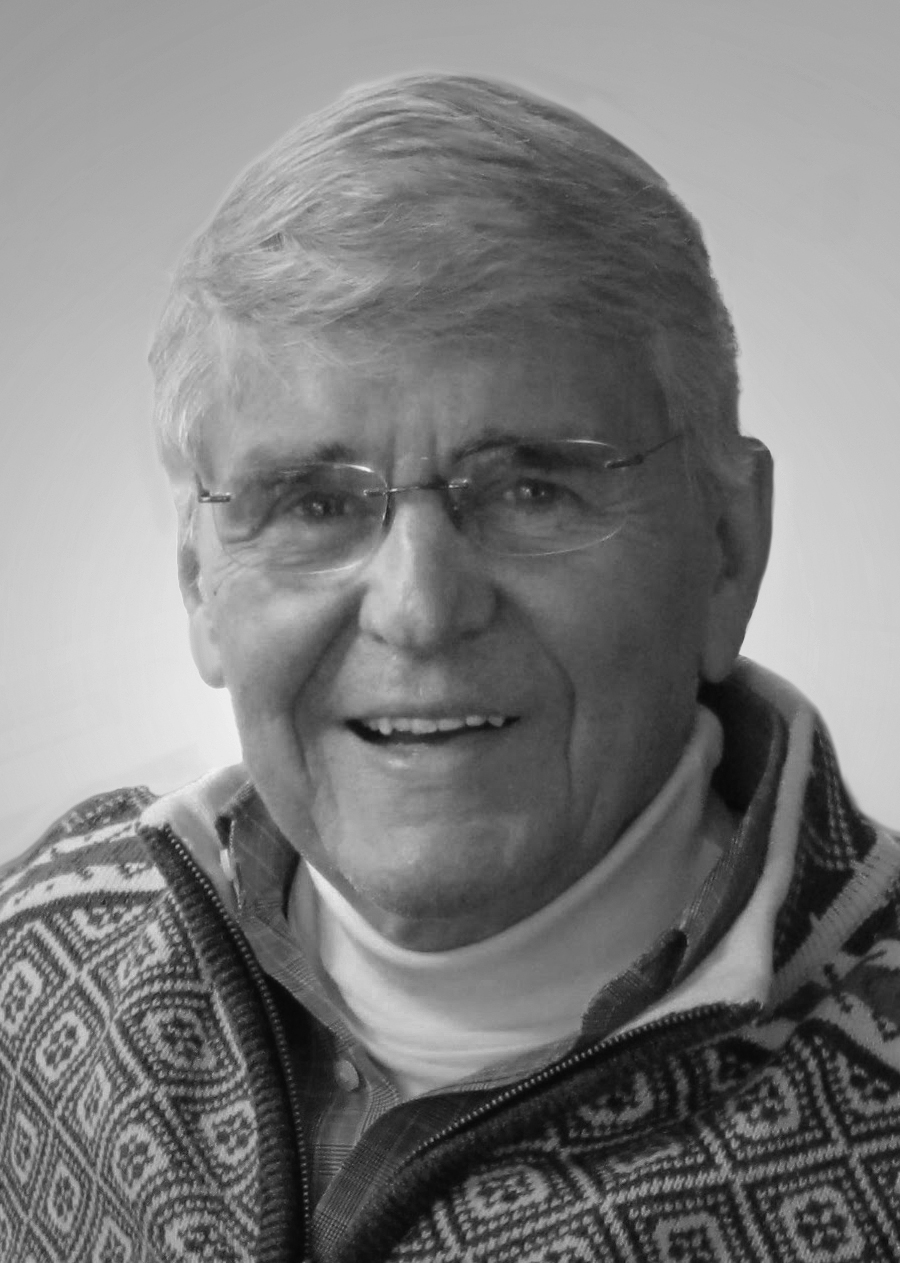
- Born: Thomas David Oakland; November 23, 1939; Kenosha, Wisconsin
- Died: March 4, 2015 (aged 75); Gainesville, Florida
- Education: Lawrence College; Indiana University
- Awards: Fulbright Scholarship (1988); APA Award for Distinguished Contributions to the International Advancement of Psychology (2003)
- Scientific career
- Fields: Educational psychology School psychology
- Workplaces: University of Texas at Austin; University of Florida
- Thesis: Social class and performance on phonemic and nonphonemic auditory discrimination tests (1967)

Thomas David Oakland (November 23, 1939 – March 4, 2015) was an American school and educational psychologist who taught at the University of Florida from 1995 until retiring in 2010. He previously taught at the University of Texas at Austin for 27 years. He was a fellow of the American Psychological Society and of four divisions of the American Psychological Association.

== Early life and education ==
Oakland was from Kenosha, Wisconsin and graduated from Kenosha High School. He graduated from Lawrence College and Indiana University Bloomington.
