= International Association for Cross-Cultural Psychology =

- Formation: March 1, 1972
- Founded at: Hong Kong
- Type: Learned society
- Purpose: Research
- Headquarters: Florida Institute of Technology, Melbourne, Florida
- Members: 800+ (2018)
- Official language: English
- President: Klaus Boehnke
- Website: www.iaccp.org

The International Association for Cross-Cultural Psychology is an international learned society dedicated to advancing research in cross-cultural psychology, and to facilitating communication among researchers in the field.

== History ==
It was founded in 1972 in Hong Kong. As of 2018, it is based at the Florida Institute of Technology in Melbourne, Florida, and has over 800 members from over 65 different countries.

== Affiliation ==
It is affiliated with the International Union of Psychological Science and the International Association of Applied Psychology. The Journal of Cross-Cultural Psychology is published on its behalf by SAGE Publications.
