= Ronald P. Rohner =

American psychologist (b. 1935)

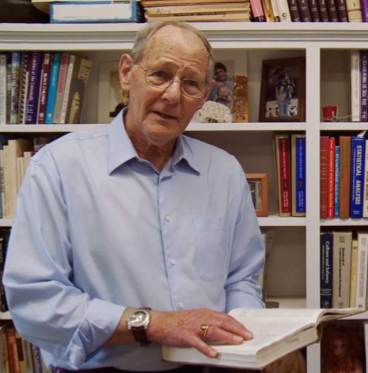
- Born: 1935 (age 90–91); Crescent City, CA
- Education: Stanford University (MA & PHD); University of Oregon (BS)
- Known for: Interpersonal Acceptance-Rejection Theory (IPARTheory); Parental acceptance-rejection
- Spouse: Nancy D. Rohner
- Children: Preston C. Rohner, Ashley C. Ezelle
- Awards: Distinguished Contributions to the International Advancement of Psychology (2004); Outstanding International Psychologist Award (2008, USA); American Psychological Association Henry David International Mentoring Award (2017); Society for Cross-Cultural Research Lifetime Achievement Award (2020); Jean Lau Chin Award for Outstanding Psychologist in Leadership Contributions (2023)

Ronald P. Rohner is an international psychologist, and a Professor Emeritus of Human Development and Family Sciences and Anthropology at the University of Connecticut. There he is also Director of the Center for the Study of Interpersonal Acceptance-Rejection, and executive director of the International Society for Interpersonal Acceptance-Rejection. He is best known for the work on interpersonal acceptance-rejection that he initiated in 1960. His extensive and seminal research led to the development of a full-blown evidence-based theory known as the interpersonal acceptance-rejection theory (IPARTheory). IPARTheory is an evidence-based theory of socialization and lifespan development. It proposes that interpersonal acceptance and rejection consistently predict the psychological and behavioral adjustment of children and adults across all ethnicities, languages, genders, cultures, and other socio-demographic groups of the world.

== Early years and education ==
Rohner was born on April 17, 1935, in Crescent City, California. His father was a career officer during World War II, but later—along with Rohner's mother—became a successful business entrepreneur. Rohner had one older sister. After completing high school at the age of 18, Rohner served two years in the army. He then went into the U.S. Military Academy at West Point for a short period of time before studying psychology, sociology, and anthropology at the University of Oregon. He graduated with a B.S. in 1958 after going through undergraduate school in three years. He and his former wife then taught for a year in the American School of Tangier, Morocco, where they were also resident directors of a dormitory of Moroccan children who attended the school. In 1960 he completed his M.A., and in 1964 he was awarded his Ph.D. in psychological anthropology. Both of the advanced degrees were from Stanford University.

== Career trajectory ==
During the course of his graduate work, he developed a lasting interest in the consequences, antecedents, and other correlates of interpersonal acceptance and rejection. This interest is embedded in a larger intellectual commitment to the fields of family studies and international psychology—especially as these fields converge on the issues of parent-child relations and the social-emotional development of children in America and internationally. Over the course of time, he authored, co-authored, and edited 18 books and special issue of journals, and he published more than 200 articles, chapters, and other publications and electronic media. In pursuit of his research endeavors, he received numerous grants from National Science Foundation, NIMH, the Smithsonian Institution, the American Philosophical Society, and other agencies.

== Academic career ==
After earning his Ph.D., Rohner accepted a faculty position at the University of Connecticut where he remains to this day as a professor emeritus. In the course of developing his research, he lived and worked in many nations, including India, the West Indies, Turkey, Morocco, several parts of Europe, and among the Kwikwasut’inuxw and Haxwa’mis people (historically known as the Kwakiutl Indians) in British Columbia, Canada. He is a former president of the board of directors of Natchaug (Psychiatric) Hospital in Mansfield, CT, as well as a founder and past president of the Society for Cross-Cultural Research. Additionally, he was the founding president of the International Society for Interpersonal Acceptance-Rejection. He has served on the executive council of the International Association for Cross-Cultural Psychology, and on the board of directors of the Connecticut Association for the Prevention of Child Abuse and Neglect. From 1975 to 1977, he took a two-year leave-of-absence from the University of Connecticut to become professor of anthropology at the Catholic University of America, where he also served as a senior scientist in the Boys Town Center for the Study of Youth Development.

== Interpersonal Acceptance-Rejection Theory (IPARTheory) ==
Rohner has dedicated his professional life to researching interpersonal (especially parental) acceptance-rejection issues throughout the lifespan. His work has led to the development of interpersonal acceptance-rejection theory (IPARTheory). The theory is composed of three subtheories, each of which deals with a separate but interrelated set of issues. Specifically, IPARTheory's personality subtheory—which is the most highly developed component of the theory—deals primarily with the pancultural nature and effects of interpersonal (especially parental) acceptance and rejection. Coping subtheory explores the fact that some individuals are better able to cope with experiences of perceived rejection than are other individuals. Finally, IPARTheory's sociocultural systems subtheory attempts to predict and explain major causes and sociocultural correlates of interpersonal acceptance-rejection worldwide. Empirical evidence overwhelmingly supports the theory's major postulates and predictions, especially postulates and prediction in personality subtheory. Emerging evidence about the neurobiological and biochemical risks posed for the development, structure, and function of the human brain are beginning to help explain why these postulates and predictions are so consistently confirmed panculturally. IPARTheory and associated measures have roots in almost six decades of research with more than 200,000 children, adolescents, and adults in over 60 nations worldwide, and with members of every major American ethnic group. Currently, IPARTheory has 25 measures available translated into 53 languages and dialects for assessing interpersonal acceptance-rejection.

== Recognition ==
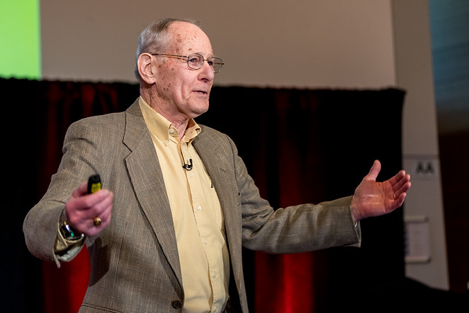
Rohner at TEDx UConn in 2017

His work is cited in TV programs, magazines, radio shows, newspapers, the documentary film "Reject", and in his TEDx UConn presentation. Rohner has been elected to the status of Fellow of the American Psychological Association, the Association for Psychological Science, and the American Anthropological Association, and the American Association for the Advancement of Science. He is also a recipient of the APA Award for Distinguished Contributions to the International Advancement of Psychology, APA's Outstanding International Psychologist Award from the US, and APA's Division 52 Henry David International Mentoring Award.

== Mentoring ==
Throughout his career, Rohner mentored trainees and faculty, many of whom went on to hold positions at academic institutions internationally.

== Legacy ==
IPARTheory has been described as a significant approach to understanding interpersonal relationships throughout human lifespan. Over the course of six decades, IPARTheory research has given rise to a surge of empirical research, and has helped in understanding and exploring interpersonal acceptance and rejection issues. IPARTheory stresses the following three foundational postulates: (1) Individuals have a biologically based need for positive response (e.g., for emotional support, care, comfort, love—i.e., acceptance) from the people important to them. (2) Individuals understand themselves to be cared about or not cared about by these people in one or a combination of four specific ways. These include, feelings that the significant other is warm and affectionate (or cold and unaffectionate), hostile and aggressive, indifferent and neglecting, and/or undifferentiated rejecting. Undifferentiated rejection refers to an individual's belief that the significant other does not really care about, want, appreciate, or love the individual, without necessarily having objective indicators that the significant other is unaffectionate, aggressive, or neglecting. (3) When individuals feel that those people who are so important in their lives do not care about them (i.e., reject them), they are biologically predisposed to respond emotionally and behaviorally in at least ten ways. These include becoming (a) anxious, (b) insecure, and (c) dependent or defensively independent depending on the form, frequency, intensity, and longevity of the perceived rejection. Additionally, rejected persons are postulated in IPARTheory to have a heightened tendency to develop problems with (d) anger, active or passive aggression, or anger-management problems, (e) impaired self-esteem, (f) impaired self-adequacy, (g) emotional unresponsiveness, and (h) emotional instability. Moreover, seriously rejected persons are expected to develop (i) a negative worldview, and other (j) cognitive distortions.

In 1977, Rohner founded the Center for the Study of Parental Acceptance and Rejection at the University of Connecticut, which was later renamed the Ronald and Nancy Rohner Center for the Study of Interpersonal Acceptance and Rejection. The Center continues to collaborate with scholars all around the world to carry out research on topics like acceptance and rejection, forgiveness and vengeance, fear of intimacy, and parental alienation.
