= Fanny M. Cheung =

Chinese psychologist

Fanny Cheung Mui-ching SBS OBE JP
- 張妙清
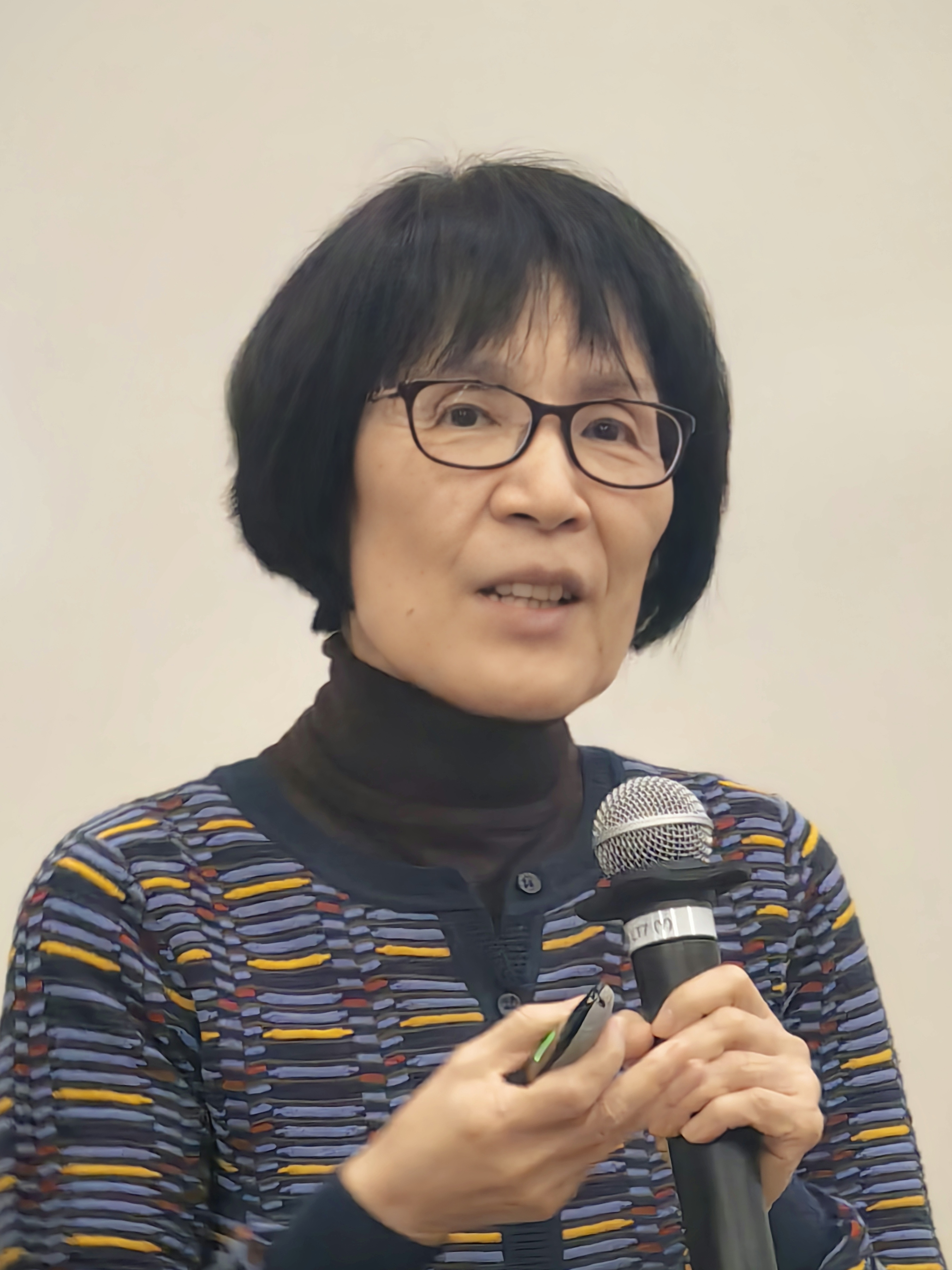
- Fanny Cheung (2025)
- Born: Hong Kong
- Occupation: Professor

Academic background
- Education: University of California, Berkeley; University of Minnesota

Academic work
- Discipline: Psychology
- Institutions: Chinese University of Hong Kong

Fanny Cheung Mui-ching is a Hong Kong psychologist and advocate of gender equality. She is an emeritus professor of psychology and honorary senior advisor of the Hong Kong Institute of Asia-Pacific Studies at the Chinese University of Hong Kong (CUHK).

== Early life and education ==
Cheung was born in British Hong Kong and raised in a "large traditional Chinese family". She earned a bachelor's degree in psychology from the University of California, Berkeley, in 1970, and a PhD in psychology from the University of Minnesota in 1975.

== Career ==
Cheung returned to Hong Kong after completing her studies and became involved in clinical work and advocacy related to mental health, sexual violence, and women's issues. In the late 1970s, Cheung led the "War on Rape" campaign in Hong Kong, to promote awareness, change attitudes, and establish better services for survivors of sexual assault.

Cheung joined the psychology faculty at CUHK in 1977. She established Hong Kong's first women's centre in the early 1980s. In 1985, she founded CUHK's Gender Research Centre and later, the school's gender studies program (the first in Hong Kong). From 1996 through 1999, she served as founding chairperson of the Equal Opportunities Commission in Hong Kong, which aims to establish anti-discrimination legislation.

Cheung is currently Emeritus Professor of Psychology and Senior Advisor to the Faculty of Social Science and the Hong Kong Institute of Asia Pacific Studies at CUHK. She was formerly Choh-Ming Li Professor of Psychology and co-director of the Hong Kong Institute of Asian Pacific Studies. She was the first woman to be appointed as Pro-Vice Chancellor in 2013 at CUHK and served as vice-president for Research from 2013 to 2020. She conducts research and publishes on topics related to cross-cultural personality assessment, psychopathology, personality, vocational behaviour, gender equality, and women leadership. She has published more than 200 articles, chapters, and books in English and Chinese. One notable contribution to the field of psychology is her development of culturally valid assessment measures. She worked on the development and validation of a Chinese translation of the Minnesota Multiphasic Personality Inventory (MMPI), a widely used measure in clinical psychology, in collaboration with researchers at the Chinese Academy of Science. She also developed the Chinese Personality Assessment Inventory (CPAI) in 1996; the CPAI has since been translated into other languages and used as the Cross-Cultural Personality Assessment Inventory.

== Awards and honours ==
Cheung was named an Officer of the Most Excellent Order of the British Empire (OBE) in 1997. In 2012, the American Psychological Association recognized Cheung with the Award for Distinguished Contributions to the International Advancement of Psychology, "for her outstanding contributions to the assessment of cross-cultural psychopathology, personality psychology, and gender issues, as well as her longstanding efforts in support of the development and advancement of psychology in Asia. In 2016, she was awarded the Silver Bauhinia Star, one of Hong Kong's highest civic honors for her long and distinguished public and community service, particularly her significant contributions to the promotion of equal opportunities and elimination of discrimination, as well as her exemplary academic achievements in psychology and her internationally renowned cross-cultural and gender studies.

== Selected works ==
- Cheung, F. M. (2025). Gentle voices, bold strides: A memoir. Chinese University of Hong Kong Press. ISBN / ISSN : 978-988-237-373-0
- Cheung, F. M., & Halpern, D. F. (Eds.). (2020). The Cambridge handbook of the international psychology of women. Cambridge, UK: Cambridge University Press, ISBN 9781108460903.
- Halpern, D.F., & Cheung, F.M. (2011). Women at the top: Powerful leaders tell us how to combine work and family. West Sussex, United Kingdom: Wiley-Blackwell.. doi:10.1002/9781444305210
- Cheung, F. M., van de Vijver, F.J.R., & Leong, F.T.L. (2011). Toward a new approach to the study of personality in culture. American Psychologist, 66(7), 593–603. doi:10.1037/a0022389
- Ho, M.Y., Cheung, F.M., & Cheung, S.F. (2010). The role of meaning in life and optimism in promoting well-being. Personality and individual differences, 48(5), 658–663. doi:10.1016/j.paid.2010.01.008
- Cheung, F.M., & Leung, K. (1998). Indigenous personality measures: Chinese examples. Journal of Cross-Cultural Psychology, 29(1), 233–248. doi:10.1177/0022022198291012
- Cheung, F.M., Leung, K., Fan, R.M., Song, W.Z., Zhang, J.X., & Zhang, J.P. (1996). Development of the Chinese personality assessment inventory. Journal of Cross-cultural psychology, 27(2), 181–199. doi:10.1177/0022022196272003
