= Interpersonal acceptance–rejection theory =

Theory of socialization and lifespan development

Interpersonal acceptance–rejection theory (IPARTheory), was authored by Ronald P. Rohner at the University of Connecticut. IPARTheory is an evidence-based theory of socialization and lifespan development that attempts to describe, predict, and explain major consequences and correlates of interpersonal acceptance and rejection in multiple types of relationships worldwide. It was previously known as "parental acceptance–rejection theory" (PARTheory). IPARTheory has more than six decades of research behind it, therefore, in 2014, the name was changed to "IPARTheory" because the central postulates of the theory generalize to all important relationships throughout the lifespan.

== Subtheories ==
IPARTheory consists of three interrelated subtheories. Together they address the causes, effects, and developmental correlates of interpersonal acceptance and rejection, as well as the global application of the theory. The three subtheories are personality subtheory, coping subtheory, and sociocultural systems subtheory and model.

=== Personality subtheory ===
Personality subtheory primarily addresses the pancultural outcomes of perceived interpersonal acceptance and rejection. Personality is defined as "an individual's more or less stable set of predispositions to respond (i.e. affective, cognitive, perceptual, and motivational dispositions) and actual modes of responding (i.e., observable behaviors) in various life situations or contexts." One major tenet of the theory states that all humans, regardless of racial, gender, cultural, or ethnic differences have a biologically based need for acceptance and positive responses from the important people, or significant others, in their lives. Significant others (attachment figures) are people that share a lasting emotional bond with and are uniquely important to a child or an adult, most often parents or romantic partners.

The nature of positive responses and acceptance behaviors from significant others may differ in specifics by culture, gender, and age. When children or adults do not receive the acceptance or positive response they need, they tend to perceive this as a form of interpersonal rejection and respond with a combination of 10 apparent pancultural dispositions. These dispositions include: anxiety, insecurity, hostility/aggression, dependency or defensive independence, negative self-esteem, negative self-adequacy, emotional unresponsiveness, emotional instability, negative worldview, and cognitive distortions.

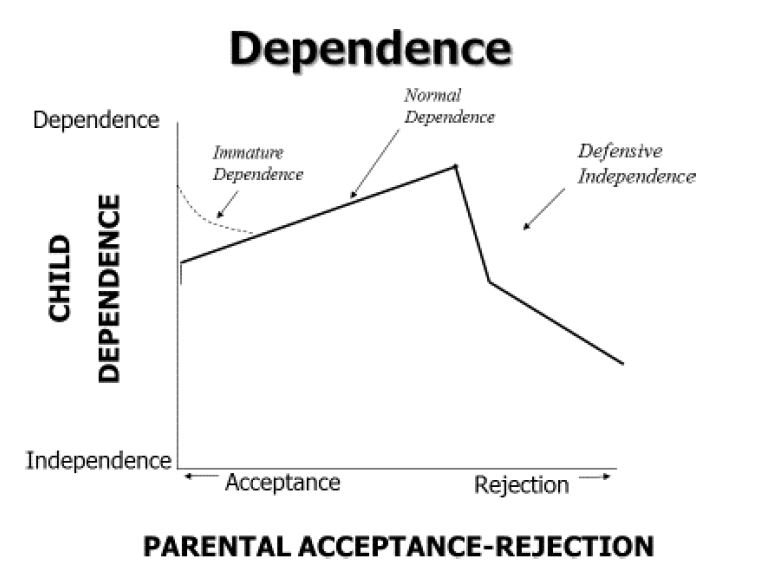
Copyright Rohner Research Publications 2021

Dependency, or "the internal, psychologically felt wish or yearning for emotional (as opposed to instrumental or task-oriented) support, care, comfort, attention, nurturance, and similar behaviors from significant others" is a very common response from people seeking acceptance following perceived rejection. People fall on a dependence continuum from independent to dependent. Where a person falls is primarily dependent on whether they perceive themselves to be accepted or rejected by significant others. Children and adults who perceive themselves to have received enough acceptance tend to show normal dependence, while children and others who do not receive enough acceptance or face rejection often develop defensive independence. Parental rejection or rejection from other significant others can result in impaired self-esteem, negative world-view, and emotional instability. In order to cope with these negative feelings and outcomes, people who feel rejected may develop defensive independence, in which a person either does not seek out or actively avoids emotional support and attachment to significant others despite still craving acceptance. Control is an additional variable influencing where someone falls on the dependency curve, children with immature dependence receive a great deal of acceptance but also intrusive parental control. This style of parenting is called "smother parenting" and children who experience it often struggle to develop age-appropriate social, emotional, and behavioral skills.

=== Coping subtheory ===
Coping subtheory seeks to understand why some children and adults do not appear to suffer the same ill effects of rejection that other rejected individuals face. The theory concentrates on affective copers, who have reasonably good mental and emotional health in the face of adversity, unlike instrumental copers, who may find success academically or professionally but still suffer with impaired mental and emotional health. The traits that make a good affective coper are still unclear, but coping subtheory uses the multivariate model of behavior to posit that the coping behavior of the individual is a function of interactions between the self (mental representations, biological, and personality characteristics of the individual), other (characteristics of the rejecting significant others, along with the form, frequency and severity of rejection), and context (other significant others, social-situational characteristics of the larger environment). Traits that appear to be associated with good affective copers include a differentiated sense of self, a strong sense of self-determination, and the ability to depersonalize.

=== Sociocultural systems model and subtheory ===
The sociocultural systems subtheory concentrates on major causes and sociocultural correlates of interpersonal acceptance–rejection in a global context. The subtheory looks at larger sociocultural factors that influence why significant others show acceptance or rejection. Larger social institutions like the economic system, family structure, and political organization tend to shape how much acceptance parents and other significant persons offer. Additionally, the cultural context can also influence how children and youth perceive their acceptance or rejection, and how they react to or cope with it. The system is also bidirectional, because a culture's tendency toward acceptance or rejection may result in different institutionalized expressive systems and behaviors, which can include people's spiritual and artistic beliefs and behaviors.

== Warmth dimension ==
IPARTheory posits that all significant interpersonal relationships fall along the warmth dimension, from interpersonal acceptance to interpersonal rejection, depending on how much love or warmth a person perceives from a significant other. The specific physical, verbal, and symbolic behaviors associated with interpersonal acceptance or rejection may differ by culture or society, but the effects of feeling acceptance or rejection remain stable across cultures. Interpersonal acceptance is marked by warmth, affection, comfort, emotional support, and love which is expressed by the significant other. Relationships that are high in interpersonal rejection, on the other hand, are characterized by an absence of positive feelings and may also include emotional withdrawal, as well as the presence of psychologically or physically hurtful behaviors.

Rejection may be experienced by any combination of four expressions: coldness or lack of affection, hostility or aggression, indifference or neglect, and undifferentiated rejection. Undifferentiated rejection is based on the perception of the individual that a parent (or an attachment figure) or other person who is important to the individual does not care about them, want them, or love them, though there may not be any behavioral manifestations from the prior three categories of rejection.

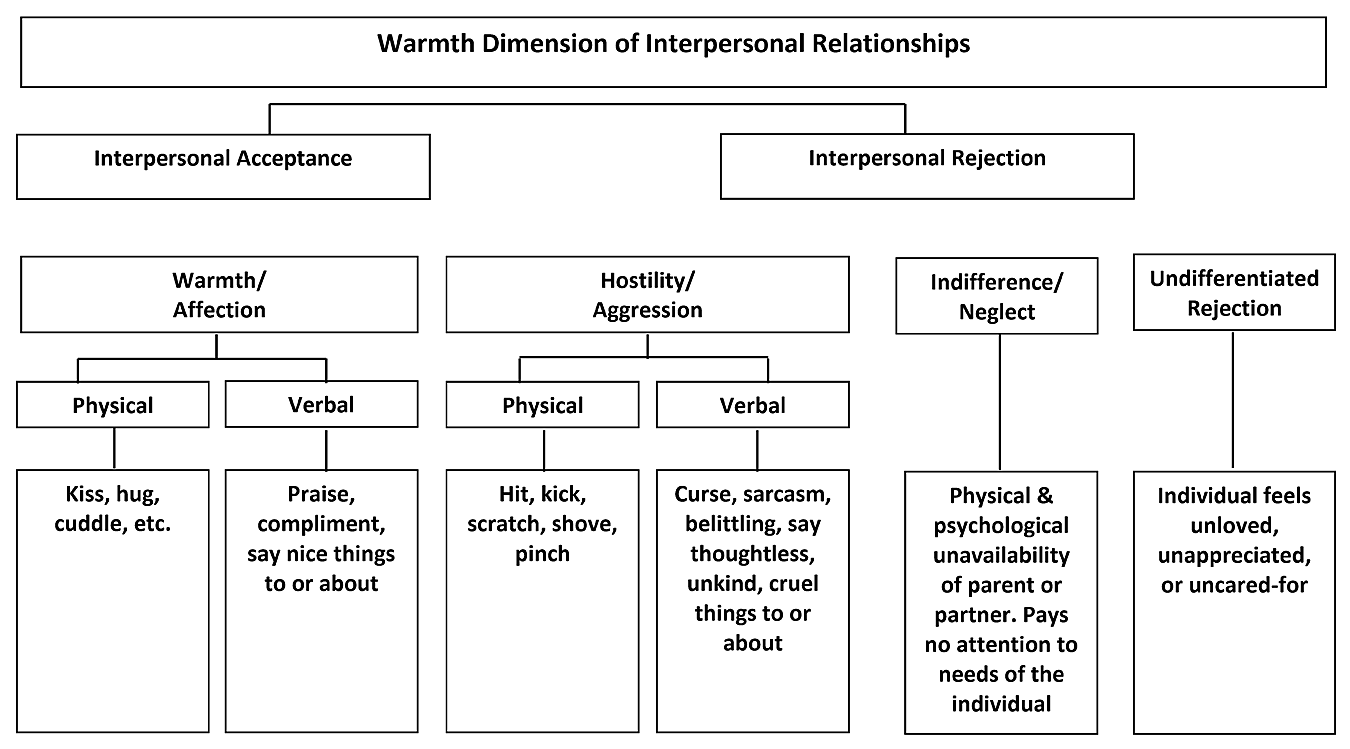
Copyright Rohner Research Publications 2021

== History ==
IPARTheory was developed by Ronald P. Rohner. He started working on issues of interpersonal acceptance and rejection as a graduate student at Stanford University in 1959. While carrying out cross-cultural analyses on the outcomes of the rejection process of children, he found that parental rejection during childhood appeared to result in similar negative outcomes across the globe. Early on, Rohner's research focused heavily on parent-child relationships and the theory was named "parental acceptance–rejection theory?" (PARTheory) after he and Evelyn C. Rohner edited a special issue of Behavior Science Research (now Cross-Cultural Research) on "Worldwide Tests of Parental Acceptance-Rejection Theory" in 1980. However, by the year 2000, Rohner and other researchers like Abdul Khaleque had started investigating the effects of rejection in non-parental significant relationships. Khaleque carried out a study which found that the effects of intimate-partner rejection had similar effects in adulthood to those of parental rejection in childhood. Following that research, other attachment figures were included in IPARTheory research, including peers, best friends, siblings, teachers, coaches, in-laws, and supervisors/managers. In 2014, the name of the theory was changed to "interpersonal acceptance–rejection theory" (IPARTheory) to reflect the broadened scope of the theory and research.
