= Frances Culbertson =

American child clinical psychologist (1921–2019)

Frances M. Culbertson
- Occupation: Professor of Psychology
- Spouse: John Culbertson
- Awards: APA Distinguished Contributions to the International Advancement of Psychology (1994); International Council of Psychologists Frances Mullen Award (2013)

Academic background
- Education: University of Michigan

Frances Mitchell Culbertson (January 31, 1921 – February 13, 2019) was a child clinical psychologist known for her work promoting international psychology and its emphasis on global and cross-national perspectives. At the time of her death, she was professor emerita of Psychology at the University of Wisconsin—Whitewater.

Culbertson worked with Frances Mullen and Calvin Catterall in forming the UNESCO-affiliated International School Psychology Association in 1974. She served as President of the International Council of Psychologists (ICP) (1979–1980) and Chair of the APA Committee on International Relations in Psychology (1982).

== Awards ==
Culbertson received the American Psychological Association Award for her Distinguished Contributions to the International Advancement of Psychology in 1994. Her award citation emphasized "outstanding contributions to the advancement of psychology and its applications throughout the world and her leadership in international psychology organizations."

Culbertson received the ICP's Frances Mullen Award in 2013. Since 2008, the ICP has awarded the Frances M. Culbertson Travel Grant to support women from developing countries in the early stages of their careers.

== Biography ==
Culbertson was born in the Dorchester neighborhood of Boston on January 31, 1921 and was the youngest of three children of Russian immigrant parents.

Culbertson attended the University of Michigan and graduated in 1947 with a B.S. degree in psychology. At Michigan, she met her husband John M. Culbertson with whom she had four children. Culbertson continued her education at University of Michigan, obtaining a master's degree in psychology in 1949 and a PhD in Social Psychology in 1955. As a graduate student she worked as a teacher assistant with Wilbert McKeachie.

The Culbertson family moved to Washington D.C in 1950 on account of her husband's work with the Federal Reserve Board. In 1957, Culbertson obtained work as a research associate at Children's Hospital in Washington, DC on study of pica disorder and lead poisoning. After her husband secured a faculty position at the University of Wisconsin–Madison in 1958, she began postdoctoral work to retrain as a clinical psychologist. After completing her post-doctoral training in clinical and child psychology in 1961, Culbertson worked various positions while raising children and moving around the country with her husband.

In 1968, Culbertson joined the faculty of the department of psychology at the University of Wisconsin—Whitewater where she remained until her retirement in 1988. After retiring from academia, Culbertson continued her work in private practice, with a focus on hypnotherapy, including for patients with Tourette syndrome. Her most cited paper, published in 1997 in the American Psychologist, reviewed the literature on depression from a cross-cultural perspective, emphasizing links between gender and depressive states.
