= Mark A. Lutz =

American economist

Mark A. Lutz (born March 1, 1941, in Zürich) is an emeritus professor of economics at the University of Maine, and the author of Economics for the Common Good, published by Routledge in 1999.

Lutz was educated at the University of California, Berkeley, where he received his Ph.D. in 1972 with a dissertation titled The Equilibrium Industrial Wage Structure: An Analysis in Terms of Wage Theory.

He is a proponent of Humanistic economics, strongly influenced by political economy of Jean Charles Leonard de Sismondi, the social economics of John Hobson, and various (heterodox) ideas of current thinkers, especially Herman Daly on environment, John Culbertson on trade, and David Ellerman on economic democracy.

His older brother is Robert Lutz, former vice-chairman of General Motors Corporation.

== Selected publications ==
A full list of publications can be found at the personal web page of Mark A. Lutz.

- The challenge of humanistic economics, co-authored by psychologist Kenneth Lux; introduction by Kenneth E. Boulding (Menlo Park, California: Benjamin/Cummings Publishing Co., 1979); also published in Chinese by Southwestern University of Finance and Economics Press (2003).
- Humanistic economics: The new challenge, co-authored by Kenneth Lux; foreword by Amitai Etzioni (New York, N.Y.: Bootstrap Press, 1988).
- Social Economics: Retrospect and Prospect (Boston: Kluwer Academic Publishers, 1990).
- Economics for the common good: Two centuries of economic thought in the humanist tradition (Advances in social economics) (London: Routledge, 1999). Also published in Chinese by Southwestern University of Finance and Economics Press (2003) and in Japanese by Koyo Shobo (2017).
