= Jefferson Fish =

American psychologist

Jefferson Morris Fish
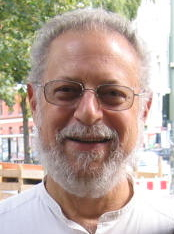
- Education: Columbia University
- Spouse: Dolores Newton
- Awards: Fulbright Scholarship; Fellow of the American Psychological Association; Fellow of the Association for Psychological Science
- Scientific career
- Fields: Psychology
- Workplaces: St. John's University
- Thesis: Empathy and the reported emotional experiences of beginning psychotherapists (1969)

Jefferson Morris Fish is an American professor emeritus of psychology at St. John's University in New York City, where he previously served as Chair of the Department of Psychology and as Director of the PhD Program in Clinical Psychology.

== Biography ==
Fish was born in Manhattan, the grandson of Eastern European Jewish immigrants. After spending his internship year, 1966–1967, at the Langley Porter Neuropsychiatric Institute in San Francisco, he returned to New York to complete his studies during the Columbia riots. He received his PhD in clinical psychology from Columbia University and was a postdoctoral fellow at the State University of New York at Stony Brook.

Although Fish had begun graduate school with the intention of becoming a psychoanalyst, he did a Rogerian PhD dissertation, followed by a postdoctoral program in behavior therapy. It was during his postdoctoral year that he developed his interests in hypnosis, placebo, and paradoxical interventions (also known as therapeutic double-binds)—leading ultimately to his involvement with family therapy. In his clinical books and articles Fish viewed therapy as a social influence process, and drew on social psychology, sociology and anthropology—-in addition to clinical psychology, psychiatry, and social work—-as sources for ideas and empirical evidence.

At Stony Brook, Fish met his wife, the African American anthropologist Dolores Newton, who had just returned from her second stint of field work with the Krikati Indians in Brazil. Married in 1970, the couple spent the years 1974-1976 as visiting professors in Brazil—including a month with the Krikati. It was there that Fish developed his interests in Brazil, languages, the relationship between psychology and anthropology, cross-cultural psychology, and the concept of race in different cultures. He contributed a panel comparing the concept of race in Brazil and the United States to the American Anthropological Association's exhibit "Race: Are We So Different?"

Fish is the author or editor of 12 books, and well over 100 journal articles, book chapters and other works. He is a Fellow of the American Psychological Association and of the Association for Psychological Science, and is board certified in Clinical Psychology and in Couple and Family Psychology by the American Board of Professional Psychology. He served in a variety of roles on local, national, and international psychology organizations and drug policy organizations, and on the editorial boards of eight psychology journals in the United States, Brazil, and India.

== Clinical psychology ==
Fish has written widely on psychotherapy as a social influence process, on social and cultural factors in therapy, and on brief therapy—including brief behavioral, cognitive, strategic, systemic, and solution focused therapies, and on the use of hypnosis in brief therapy. In Placebo Therapy, for example, Fish argued that stimulating the client's positive expectancy of change was a primary source of the effectiveness of therapy. Hence, rather than attempting to minimize or control for the placebo effect, therapy should be structured so as to maximize it. Patrick Pentony's Models of Influence in Psychotherapy presented Fish's placebo model as one of only three models of influence underlying the numerous systems of psychotherapy. (The other two are the resocialization model and the contextual model). Fish's book also stimulated Irving Kirsch's research on response expectancy theory, in which people's experience—such as becoming calmer or happier—is affected by what they expect to experience.

== Cross-cultural psychology ==
Within cross-cultural psychology his writings have dealt mainly with comparing and contrasting the race concept in a variety of cultures, the race-IQ debate, and Brazil. Contrary to the folk view of race as a fixed biological phenomenon, Fish argues that people can change their race simply by traveling from one culture to another. What changes is not what they look like, or their genes, or ancestry, but rather the set of cultural categories (folk taxonomy) each culture uses to classify them. Fish's article Mixed Blood, comparing the American and Brazilian conceptions of race, has been anthologized by various disciplines, including history and anthropology. Fish was a Fulbright Scholar in Brazil and China. He speaks Portuguese, French, Spanish, and German.

== Drug policy ==
Fish has contrasted two causal models underlying drug policy. The current view is that drugs cause crime and corruption, and spread disease. As a result, drugs have been made illegal. Drug dealers have armed themselves to combat law enforcement, and an escalating arms race has ensued. Fish has argued that this model is fallacious, and has argued for an alternative model: Drug prohibition causes a black market, and the black market causes crime and corruption, and spreads disease. As a result, drug policy should be aimed at shrinking the black market. To achieve this aim, he has been active in bringing together multidisciplinary, international, and American sub-cultural perspectives on drug policy, and to promoting consideration of a wide range of policy alternatives to the war on drugs. He has served as Adjunct Coordinator of the Committee on Drugs and the Law of the Association of the Bar of the City of New York; and his broadening the discussion of policy alternatives has influenced debates in legal and policy circles.

== Journalism ==
Since his retirement in 2006, Fish has been involved in writing for a broader audience; and he has published in Psychology Today, The Humanist, The Independent Review, and Newsday. His Psychology Today blog is "Looking in the Cultural Mirror".

== Selected works ==
- Fish, J. M. (1973). Placebo therapy: A practical guide to social influence in psychotherapy. San Francisco, CA: Jossey-Bass. ISBN 0-87589-190-X
- Fish, J. M. (1976). Dimensões da empatia terapêutica. Campinas, São Paulo, Brazil: Pontifícia Universidade Católica de Campinas. (Dimensions of therapeutic empathy. Published in Portuguese.)
- Pfafflin, S. M., Sechzer, J. A., Fish, J. M., & Thompson, R. L. (Eds.). (1990). Psychology: Perspectives and Practice. New York City, NY: New York Academy of Sciences. (Annals, Vol. 602)ISBN 0-89766-601-1 (cloth), ISBN 0-89766-601-1 (paper), ISSN 0077-8923
- Fish, J. M. (1996). Culture and therapy: An integrative approach. Northvale, NJ: Jason Aronson. ISBN 1-56821-545-2
- Fish, J. M. (Ed.) (1998). How to legalize drugs. Northvale, NJ: Jason Aronson. ISBN 0-7657-0151-0
- Fish, J. M. (Ed.) (2000). Is our drug policy effective? Are there alternatives? New York City, NY: Fordham Urban Law Journal. (Proceedings of the March 17 & 18, 2000 joint conference of the New York Academy of Sciences, New York Academy of Medicine, and Association of the Bar of the City of New York. Vol. 23, No. 1, pp. 3–262.)
- Fish, J. M. (Ed.) (2002). Race and intelligence: Separating science from myth. Mahwah, NJ: Lawrence Erlbaum Associates. ISBN 0-8058-3757-4
- Gielen, U. P., Fish, J. M. & Draguns, J. G. (Eds.) (2004). Handbook of culture, therapy, and healing. Mahwah, NJ: Lawrence Erlbaum Associates. ISBN 0-8058-4924-6
- Fish, J. M. (Ed.) (2006). Drugs and society: U. S. public policy. Lanham, MD: Rowman & Littlefield. ISBN 0-7425-4244-0 (cloth); ISBN 0-7425-4245-9 (paperback)
- Gielen, U. P., Draguns, J. G., & Fish, J. M. (Eds.) (2008). Principles of multicultural counseling and therapy. New York: Routledge. ISBN 978-0-8058-6205-8 (cloth); ISBN 978-0-8058-6204-1 (paperback)
- Fish, J. M. (2011). The concept of race and psychotherapy. New York: Springer Science + Business Media. ISBN 978-1-4419-7575-1; e-ISBN 978-1-4419-7576-8
- Fish, J. M. (2013). The myth of race. New York: Argo-Navis. ISBN 9780786754366; e-ISBN 9780786754373
