= Journal of Cross-Cultural Psychology =

- Discipline: Psychology
- Language: English
- Edited by: Theodore Bartholomew and Antonio Terracciano

Publication details
- History: 1970-present
- Publisher: SAGE Publications
- Frequency: 10/year
- Impact factor: 3.6 (2025)

Standard abbreviations
- ISO 4: J. Cross-Cult. Psychol.

Indexing
- ISSN: 0022-0221 (print); 1552-5422 (web)
- LCCN: 74109041
- OCLC no.: 1587107

Links
- Journal homepage; Online access; Online archive

Journal of Cross-Cultural Psychology is a peer-reviewed academic journal that covers research in the field of cross-cultural psychology. The editor-in-chief are Theodore Bartholomew (Scripps College) and Antonio Terracciano (Florida State University). It has been in publication since 1970 and is published by SAGE Publications.

== Abstracting and indexing ==
The journal is abstracted and indexed in Scopus and the Social Sciences Citation Index. According to the Journal Citation Reports, its 2025 impact factor is 3.6, Q1.

== See also ==
- International Association for Cross-Cultural Psychology
