= Mary Jane Rotheram-Borus =

American licensed psychologist

- Born: December 7, 1949 (age 76)
- Education: University of Southern California University of California, Irvine
- Organization: University of California, Los Angeles
- Known for: Maternal and Child Health, Family Wellness, HIV/AIDS Prevention
- Title: Professor of Clinical Psychology, Director of Global Center for Children and Families
- Website: www.maryjanerotheram.com

Mary Jane Rotheram-Borus (born December 7, 1949) is a licensed clinical psychologist and professor with the University of California, Los Angeles, Department of Psychiatry and Biobehavioral Sciences. Rotheram is the professor-in-residence in the Semel Institute for Neuroscience and Human Behavior. She is the Director of the Global Center for Children and Families at UCLA and the former director of the Center for HIV Identification, Prevention, and Treatment Services.

== Education and early career ==
Rotheram received her undergraduate degree from the University of California, Irvine in 1971 and her PhD in Clinical Psychology with an emphasis in child and community psychology from the University of Southern California in 1977. She was a professor of Clinical Psychology in the division of child psychiatry at Columbia University from 1982 to 1993.

During her tenure at Columbia, Rotheram co-directed a clinic for suicidal adolescents and initiated her evidence-based programs on suicide, depression, and HIV. She mounted and evaluated multiple interventions which have now been selected and reviewed by the Substance Abuse and Mental Health Services Administration (SAMHSA), the Centers for Disease Control and Prevention (CDC) and the American Psychological Association (APA) as efficacious programs.

In 1993, Dr. Rotheram moved to UCLA, where she has been a professor for over 20 years. During this time, she led a national center for HIV prevention funded by the National Institute of Mental Health (NIMH) and founded the UCLA Family Commons, a placed-based preventive program to promote well-being for children and families.

== Research interests ==
Dr. Rotheram's research interests include HIV and AIDS prevention with adolescents, children and family wellness, and assessment and modification of children's social skills. Dr. Rotheram has received more than 80 grants from the National Institute of Health to study HIV prevention with adolescents, the chronically mentally ill, and persons with sexually transmitted diseases; to study interventions for children whose parents have AIDS and for HIV-positive adolescents; and to examine national patterns of use, costs, outcomes, and need for children's and adolescents' mental health service programs.

In 1986, her work on suicide prevention was selected as the Outstanding Child and Adolescent Mental Health Program by the New York State Department of Mental Health, and her assertiveness training with children was chosen as an exemplary model by the American Psychological Association. Her research also has been funded by the National Science Foundation, National Institute on Drug Abuse, National Institute of Mental Health, National Institute on Alcohol Abuse and Alcoholism, Society for Research in Child Development, and the W. T. Grant Foundation.

== Publications ==
Dr. Rotheram has published more than 300 journal articles, 11 Training Manuals, 63 book chapters, and two edited volumes, Planning to Live: Evaluating and Treating Suicidal Teens in Community Settings and Children’s Ethnic Socialization: Pluralism and Development.

== Scientific leadership ==
Rotheram pursues research to find better ways to promote family wellness. Her leadership in disruptive technologies is one example of how she is asking science and prevention to progress intentionally and thoughtfully. To that end, Rotheram has been recognized with several awards and commendations for her work. In 2001, Science identified her as number two of the top-funded NIH multi-grant recipients; she was the only woman in the top ten.

Dr. Rotheram has overseen dozens of groundbreaking national and international efforts related to all aspects of HIV and AIDS. She has guided researchers’ efforts to identify and address health disparities across different communities by using experts from a variety of fields. She notes 45 trainees whose research is making a difference in people's lives, including 22 trainees who are now successful academic faculty members.

== Appointments ==
- Professor-in-residence, Semel Institute for Neuroscience and Human Behavior, Department of Psychiatry, University of California, Los Angeles Director, Global Center for Children and Families, University of California, Los Angeles (1993–present).
- Bat-Yaacov Professor of Child Psychiatry and Biobehavioral Sciences, Director, Global Center for Children and Families. University of CA, Los Angeles (2005-2014).
- Professor of Clinical Psychology, Associate Clinical Professor of Medical Psychology, Division of Child Psychiatry, Columbia University, New York Center, New York; Research Scientist, New York State Psychiatric Institute, New York (1984–1993).
- Associate Professor, Assistant Professor, Department of Psychology, California State University, Los Angeles (1978‑1984).
- Assistant Professor, Department of Psychology, Ohio State University (1977‑1978).
- Co-organizer, eKids: use of technologies for research on and with children and youth. Jacobs Foundation (2015).
- Member, the Suicide Prevention Research Prioritization Task Force, National Institute of Mental Health (2013).
- Summit on Shared Research Priorities, Research Frontiers in HIV, HIV-related Malignancies and TB, National Institute of Mental Health, Durban, South Africa (2013).
- Member, Institute of Medicine – National Research Council, Forum on Promoting Children's Cognitive, Affective, and Behavioral Health
- Member, National Advisory Council, National Institute of Mental Health
- Member, President's Emergency Program for AIDS Relief, Scientific Advisory Board, Office of the U.S. AIDS Global Coordinator
- Member, Office of AIDS Research Panel
- Member, Working Group on Peers for Progress, Peer Support Around the World
- Member, National Advisory Council, National Institute of Drug Abuse
- Advisory Board Member, Council for Training in Evidence-Based Behavioral Practice
- Member, Advisory Summit, X PRIZE Foundation.
- Member, Center Director's Working Group, National Institute of Mental Health.
- Society for Prevention Research (Program Chair, 2005 Annual Meeting; board member; Abstract Chair for 2004 Annual Meeting).
- Member, NIMH AIDS Orphans Research Agenda Group.
- Co-chair, Emerging Adulthood Group, National Institute for Drug Abuse.
- Member, Special Panel on Prevention, Management, and Control of Tuberlculosis; National Heart, Lung, and Blood Institute.
- Member, American Psychological Association Ad Hoc Committee, Psychology and AIDS.
- Board Member, Executive Committee on Planning, AIDS Project Los Angeles, Los Angeles, CA.
- Member, Task Force, University AIDS Research Program, State of California
- Associate Director, UCLA AIDS Institute.
- Co-chair, NIMH Workgroup on Processes for Changing People's Behavior, Bethesda, MD.
- Co-chair, Coordinating Committee, National Conference on Early Detection, Bethesda, MD.
- Member, university wide AIDS Research Program, AIDS Prevention Evaluation Advisory Committee, Treatment and Care Advisory Committee.
- National Institute of Mental Health Workgroup on Indo-U.S. Collaboration on HIV/STD Prevention, New Delhi, India.
- Member, Collaborative Group on Women and HIV/AIDS, U.S. Department of Health and Human Services, Public Health Services, Office on Women's Health and Office of HIV/AIDS Policy.
- Member, NIMH Consortium on Families and HIV and AIDS.
- Member, Consortium on Technology Transfer of Innovations, National Institute of Mental Health.
- Technical Advisory Group, AIDSCAP, Family Health International.
- Board of Directors, Research Foundation for Mental Hygiene, State of New York.
- Committee for Protection of Human Participants, American Psychological Association.
- Planning and Executive Committees: First and Second International Conferences on HIV and Homeless Youths.
- Committee on Ethics, Office for the Protection on Research Rights for Children, National Institutes of Health.
- American Association for the Advancement of Science
- American Psychological Association, Member of Division 12 (Clinical), 18 (Psychological Study of Social Issues), and Fellow in Division 27 (Community Psychology)
- Society for Research in Child Development
- American Association of Orthopsychiatry, Program Committee 1984‑1988, Institute Committee, 1987-1988

== Awards ==
- Excellence in prevention of HIV, American Medical Association Award: HIV prevention among runaway and homeless youths
- Outstanding Mental Health Project for Children and Adolescents, New York State Office of Mental Health: Evaluation and triage of suicidal runaways
- Exemplary prevention model, American Psychological Association: Assertiveness training with elementary school children
- CFAK Annual Meeting Senior Researcher Award –American Academy of Child and Adolescent Psychiatry
- Bennett Lecturer in Prevention Science – Pennsylvania State University
- Family Coaching Clinics Project – one of three winners in Robert Wood Johnson Foundation Competition for Disruptive Innovations
- Distinguished Leader in Psychology and AIDS Award, presented by the American Psychological Association Committee on Psychology and AIDS
- Outstanding Research Mentor Award, University of California, Los Angeles, presented by the UCLA Department of Psychiatry and Biobehavioral Sciences
- International Collaborative Prevention Research Award, Society for Prevention Research, for outstanding contributions to the field of prevention science
- Exemplary prevention programs, Centers for Disease Control and Prevention, Compendium of HIV Prevention Interventions with Evidence of Effectiveness: 1) Street Smart, 2) Teens Linked to Care, 3) Project LIGHT, 4) CLEAR, 5) Adolescent Project Light, 6) Healthy Living and 7) Safety Counts.
