= Social Axioms Survey =

For the last several decades research in cross-cultural psychology has focused on the cultural patterning and positioning of values. Unfortunately, values have low predictive power for actual behavior. Researchers at the Chinese University of Hong Kong decided to develop a questionnaire to measure beliefs, i.e., what is believed to be true about the world, to add to the power of values, i.e., what the person believes is valuable, in predicting behavior.

They administered the original Social Axioms Survey (SAS) in five countries and used exploratory and confirmatory factor analysis to evaluate the individual-level data. Five factors were found: Social cynicism, Social complexity, Reward for application, Religiosity and Fate control. However, analyzing the data on a country-wide level yielded only two factors: Societal cynicism and a combination of the other four factors labeled Dynamic externality. The SAS has proven useful in many research contexts, and eight years later the original researchers developed an updated version, the SAS II, using a more complex methodology to increase the reliability of the various factors. The SAS II is currently being used in research as the more comprehensive and reliable measure of beliefs about the world.

== Definition of social axioms and their usefulness ==
The study of values has a long history in psychological research, for instance, Rokeach's value scale, which has been used widely. That focus has also been transferred to the study of culture in psychology. The anthropologists Kluckhohn and Strodtbeck conducted a large-scale study of values in five Southwestern US cultures in the 1950s. However, it was Geert Hofstede's cultural dimensions theory that really initiated the wave of cross-cultural research on values. His four (later increased to six) dimensions of cultural values have become a major tool in many kinds of cross-cultural research. Values, however, have important limitations for predicting behavior. A value states that, "X is good/desirable/important," but it does not indicate if a person thinks that X is obtainable. A belief, on the other hand, is a statement about how things work in reality. A social axiom, according to Leung and Bond's (2002) definition, describes how the world and society are believed to work. In other words, "...a typical social axiom has the structure – A is related to B. A and B can be any entities, and the relationship can be causal or correlational." The strength of a belief can vary from person to person. Furthermore, a social axiom is different from a normative belief. Normative beliefs tell us what we ought to do, e.g., be polite to everyone. Social axioms are a guide as to what it is "possible" to do.

Leung and Bond (2008) provide a formal definition of social axioms:

"Social axioms are generalized beliefs about people, social groups, social institutions, the physical environment, or the spiritual world as well as about categories of events and phenomena in the social world. These generalized beliefs are encoded in the form of an assertion about the relationship between two entities or concepts."

Social axioms act as a practical guide to human conduct in everyday life. They function in at least four ways. "They facilitate the attainment of important goals (instrumental), help people protect their self-worth (ego-defensive), serve as a manifestation of people's values (value-expressive), and help people understand the world (knowledge)." Leung and Bond (2002) also argue that because people in all cultures face similar challenges in everyday life, these axioms should be universal, even if people in each culture do not believe in them with the same strength.

== Development ==
The Social Axioms Survey (SAS) was developed with the cooperation of researchers in Hong Kong and Venezuela, using materials from local residents along with sources in the psychology literature to develop and screen items for the Survey. The survey was then refined using data from Japan, the US and Germany.

=== Generating survey items ===
Three methods were used to generate a list of possible items for the Survey:

- Examining the extensive literature already existing on beliefs in the English-language psychology literature
- Content analysis of popular literature in Hong Kong and Venezuela, including newspapers, textbooks, language surveys, proverbs, popular songs, etc.
- Interviews with adults in Hong Kong and Venezuela, both "on the street" and in-depth. Three sets of interview questions were used: "...(a) the beliefs and principles that guide their interactions with others, and their beliefs about everyday matters, (b) beliefs with regard to the self, other people, social relations, social groups, the environment, and the supernatural, and (c) beliefs with regard to issues on health, love, marriage, society, politics, religion, entertainment/recreation, work, family, sports and life in general".

=== Screening the items and assembling the Survey ===
Of the more than four thousand items collected, only about a third came from professional literature, and the other two-thirds from non-academic sources. These items were classified, similar items were eliminated, and the remaining items were rewritten to be clear. The rewritten items were then classified into 33 subcategories, and the subcategories supplemented with newly generated items to give equal coverage.

The first working version contained 182 items. Scoring used a 5-point Likert-type scale, which ranged from "strongly believe" to a neutral midpoint "no opinion", to "strongly disbelieve", a standard English version was used to generate Chinese and Spanish versions.

=== First administration ===
The Survey was administered in both Venezuela and Hong Kong, using both university students (100 and 128 respectively), and citizens approached on the street (122 and 230). The adults completing the survey covered a range of ages, both genders and, in Venezuela, both urban and working participants.

=== Analyzing the results ===
The data were analyzed separately for Hong Kong and Venezuela using cluster analysis as well as exploratory factor analysis and confirmatory factor analysis to see if there were patterns of relationship among the beliefs within each culture. The analysis pointed to a five factor solution – five clusters of beliefs that seem to be interrelated. The five factors overlapped substantially between the Hong Kong and Venezuelan samples, indicating that they were valid for both cultures. For a second analysis, the scores from both cultures were combined, and principal components analysis was used. Five factors were again obtained. The survey was shortened by eliminating items that had low factor loadings or were inconsistent with the meaning of their factors, resulting in a final survey of 60 questions.

=== Expanding the study ===
Another study was conducted to explore the SAS in three more cultures with differing value orientations on Hofstede's cultural dimensions scale. The questionnaire was given to college students in Germany, Japan and the United States. Confirmatory factor analysis checked by Procrustes rotation was used to analyze the data, and again five factors were found, although some differences between cultures were found, especially for Spirituality (subsequently renamed Religiosity) and Fate control.

== Description of the factors ==
The bulk of social axiom research has revolved around the five factors identified in the original set of studies:

- Social cynicism: "...a negative assessment of human nature, a biased view against some groups of people, a mistrust of social institutions, and a belief that people disregard ethical means in achieving their ends." Sample items: "Powerful people tend to exploit others; "Kind-hearted people usually suffer losses;" "It is rare to see a happy ending in real life."
- Social complexity: "...there are multiple ways of achieving a given outcome and ...a given person's behavior is inconsistent from situation to situation." Sample items: "Human behavior changes with the social context;" "One has to deal with matters according to the specific circumstances;" "To deal with things in a flexible way leads to success."
- Reward for application: "...effort, knowledge, careful planning, and the investment of these and other resources will lead to positive results." Sample items: Hard-working people will achieve more in the end;" "Adversity can be overcome by effort;" "Every problem has a solution."
- Religiosity (originally called Spirituality): "...assert[s] the existence of a supernatural being and the beneficial social functions of religious institutions and practices." Sample items: "There is a supreme being controlling the universe." "Belief in a religion helps one understand the meaning of life;" "Religious faith contributes to good mental health."
- Fate control: "...a belief that life events are determined by grand external forces, but reassuringly, there are some ways for people to influence the impact of these forces." Sample items: "Fate determines one's successes and failures"; "Good luck follows if one survives a disaster"; "Most disasters can be predicted."

Subsequently, researchers have proposed the addition of a sixth social axiom, belief in a zero-sum game.

== Multilevel analysis ==
Cross-cultural studies have analyzed data at two levels. Analysis can use the scores from individuals as data for statistical analysis, as the original SAS studies did, or it can use the averages of whole countries as data points, as Hofstede's values study did. These two methods can give very different results, since the patterns of scores within a country may be different from the average of the whole country sample.

To determine the factor structure of the SAS at the culture level Bond, Leung et al. (2004) collected and analyzed SAS scores from 41 cultures. The data were analyzed at both the individual and country level. While the individual data yielded the expected five-factor structure, the country-level analysis yielded only a two-factor solution. Almost all items in one factor are contained in the original factor Social cynicism, so the factor was named Societal cynicism. The other factor contains items from the other four original factors. It was named Dynamic externality, combining both the "external" aspects of religiosity and fate control, and the "dynamic" aspects of Reward for application. Only one item from Social complexity appeared.

A 2015 study across 33 countries has supported the replicability of the five-factor structure at the individual level across different countries, however, findings at the country level were less consistent.

== Development of the Social Axioms Survey II ==
Eight years after their original construction of the SAS, the researchers developed a revised version (the SAS II) to improve its reliability. The earlier reliabilities of Social complexity and Fate control were lower than they liked, and they hoped to generally improve its performance between cultures.

In developing the SAS II a different strategy was used. The original SAS was inductive – it examined the data and then constructed the axiom categories. The weakness of this method is that some categories may not have been adequately represented in the original group of items. Over the course of eight years, research had shown that the SAS was valid, and could be used in a theory-driven approach to build the SAS II. Another difficulty with the original SAS was that the scale was developed using many Western-influenced items. Those items might not have the same meaning in other cultures, and axioms derived from those items might not be adequately valid. Van de Vijver and Leung (1997) proposed the "culturally decentered" approach, in which items are created by researchers from many cultural groups, and the final questionnaire is analyzed so that items that are answered differently by different groups are changed or eliminated. The culturally-decentered approach was used for the development of the SAS II. The SAS II yielded more reliable measures of Social complexity and Fate Control, and showed that Fate control could be sub-divided into two separate components, Fate determination and Fate alterability.

== Representative research using survey ==
Level of knowledge of a culture's social axioms predicts adjustment levels of immigrants. Kurman and Ronen-Eilon (2004) demonstrated that an immigrant's level of knowledge of the host culture's social axioms is a better predictor of adjustment than whether the immigrant shares the host culture's values or social axioms themselves. This is in agreement with Berry's model of acculturation, which maintains that the best strategy for immigrant success is integration – learning how to operate in the host culture without assimilating one's own values and beliefs completely.

Social axioms supplement the predictive power of values. Bond et al. showed that using social axioms added to the power of values to predict vocational choice, style of conflict resolution and style of coping.

== See also ==
- Cross-cultural psychology
