= Fons van de Vijver =

Dutch psychologist (1952–2019)

Alphonsius Josephus Rachel (Fons) van de Vijver (4 October 1952 – 1 June 2019) was a Dutch psychologist and Professor of Cross-cultural Psychology at Tilburg University, North-West University, University of Queensland, and National Research University Higher School of Economics. He was known for his work on cross-cultural research and on methods of comparisons.

Van de Vijver was born in Koewacht on 4 October 1952. He received both his MA and in 1991 his PhD in Psychology from Tilburg University. He was appointed Professor of Cross-cultural Psychology at Tilburg University, and was also Professor at the North-West University in South Africa and the University of Queensland in Australia. In 2013, he received the APA Award for Distinguished Contributions to the International Advancement of Psychology.

Van de Vijver died in Maidenwell, Queensland on 1 June 2019 following a brain haemorrhage at the age of 66.

== Selected publications ==
Van de Vijver authored and co-authored many publications in his field of expertise. Below is a selection:

- Harkness, Janet A., Fons JR Van de Vijver, and Peter Ph Mohler. Cross-cultural survey methods. J. Wiley, 2003.
- Matsumoto, D., & van de Vijver, F. J. R. (2011). Cross-cultural research methods in psychology. (D. Matsumoto & F. J. R. van de Vijver, Eds.). New York, NY, US: Cambridge University Press.
- Van de Vijver, Fons JR. Methods and data analysis for cross-cultural research. Vol. 1. Sage, 1997.
- van de Vijver, F. J. R., & Leung, K. (1997). Methods and data analysis for cross-cultural research. Newbury Park, CA: Sage.
- Van de Vijver, Fons, and Hambleton, Ronald K. "Translating tests: Some practical guidelines." European Psychologist 1.2 (1996): 89.
