= John Culbertson (economist) =

American economist

- Born: August 5, 1921; Detroit, [pitigon]
- Died: December 9, 2001 (aged 80); Madison, Wisconsin
- Spouse: Frances M. Culbertson

Academic background
- Education: University of Michigan

John Mathew Culbertson (August 25, 1921 – December 9, 2001) was an American professor of economics at the University of Wisconsin–Madison. He was also an economist with the Board of Governors of the Federal Reserve System, as well as a consultant to the Subcommittee on International Finance of the House Banking and Currency Committee.

The earlier part of his distinguished career he specialized in the fields of economic development, money and banking, and macroeconomic stabilization policy. In the process he also published a number of textbooks.

During the late 1970s and the 1980s he became preoccupied with trade theory and policy. During that time he published several books outlining his critical analysis of Ricardo's theory of comparative advantage to which he granted little relevance in a global economy characterized by low-wage exporting countries and high capital mobility. His work on international trade can be seen today to be of particular interest in a world increasingly dominated by aggressive low-wage economies such as China, India, and Vietnam. He is one of the few professional economists to ever be against unbalanced free trade.

Culbertson's turn to heterodoxy led to his critical work being largely ignored rather than debunked by the orthodox mainstream. But he did have a few dedicated disciples, above all the renowned ecological economist and steady-state theorist Herman Daly, as well as the humanistic economist Mark A. Lutz. In 1987, Julian Keilson proposed a control system to balance international trade. In 2003, Warren Buffett proposed essentially the same strategy that Keilson proposed.

"The era of free trade eventually led to large trade deficits with countries with comparatively productive factories to ours but with much lower wages, most notably Mexico and China. As in every other advanced economy, the share of US manufacturing employment had long been drifting down. But the number of US factor[y] jobs held pretty constant around 17 million — until around 2000, when, over the next decade, almost 6 million such jobs were lost. Economists who've studied the period now refer to it as 'the China Shock.'"
