= Klaus Boehnke =

German psychologist

- Born: April 23, 1951 (age 75); Oldenburg, Germany
- Occupations: Psychologist, Social scientist

Academic background
- Education: Technische Universität Berlin
- Doctoral advisor: Professor Rainer K. Silbereisen

Klaus Boehnke (* April 23, 1951, in Oldenburg/Oldb) is a German psychologist and social scientist. He has taught and researched at Constructor University, Bremen, Germany (previously known as the International University Bremen—until 2006—and as Jacobs University Bremen until 2022) since 2002. From 2017 to February 2022, he was Deputy Director of the Center for Sociocultural Research at the Higher School of Economics (HSE) in Moscow.

== Early life ==
Boehnke studied English, Russian and Psychology in Saarbrücken, Bochum and Berlin. He completed his teacher training in 1975 in Berlin with a state examination in English and Russian. He completed his psychology studies in 1980 at Berlin University of Technology with an MA-equivalent diploma (thesis supervisor Professor Jürgen Bortz). In 1985, also at Berlin University of Technology, he received his doctorate (Dr. phil.) in psychology (doctoral supervisor Professor Rainer K. Silbereisen). In 1992, the Free University of Berlin conferred the so-called habilitation degree on him and bestowed him with the Venia Legendi ("Right to Read") for Psychology (habilitation mentor Professor Hans Merkens).

== Career ==
After receiving his diploma, Boehnke first worked as a research associate at the Institute of Psychology at Berlin University of Technology and then in positions equivalent to an assistant, later associate professor at the Institute of General and Comparative Educational Science at the Free University of Berlin. From 1990 to 1992, he worked as a DAAD guest lecturer for 18 months at the Pedagogy Section of Humboldt University in Berlin. In 1993, he was appointed to the Socialization Research and Empirical Social Research professorship at the Institute of Sociology of Chemnitz University of Technology. In 2002, he relinquished his tenure as a civil servant and accepted a professorship for social science methodology at the private then-International University Bremen, now Constructor University.

Boehnke held several long-term guest lectureships, first at the Australian National University in Canberra in 1987, then at the University of Toronto in 1997/98, and 2008/9 at the National University of Singapore.

From 2000 to 2008, Boehnke served as Secretary General of the International Association for Cross-Cultural Psychology (IACCP) and its President from 2018 to 2020. He served as president of the Division of Political Psychology of the International Association of Applied Psychology (IAAP) from 2004 to 2010 and as chair of the German Peace Psychology Association from 2005 to 2013.

Boehnke has received several academic awards, including the Fukuhara Award from the International Council of Psychology (ICP), the Distinguished Contributions to the International Advancement of Psychology Award, and most recently, the Ralph K. White Lifetime Achievement Award from the American Psychological Association.

Boehnke's research focuses on political socialization, social cohesion, and value transmission in cross-cultural comparison. He has published 14 monographs and 7 edited volumes, about 170 peer-reviewed journal articles, and a similar number of book chapters.

== Personal life ==
He comes from a middle-class family. His father was a member of middle management in a pharmaceutical wholesale company, and his mother was a high school teacher. His brother is a family doctor. He is married to Mandy Boehnke, Vice President of Universität Bremen, and has four children.
