= Climate change and indigenous peoples =

Climate change disproportionately impacts indigenous peoples around the world when compared to non-indigenous peoples. These impacts are particularly felt in relation to health, environments, and communities. Some Indigenous scholars of climate change argue that these disproportionately felt impacts are linked to ongoing forms of colonialism. Indigenous peoples found throughout the world have strategies and traditional knowledge to adapt to climate change, through their understanding and preservation of their environment. These knowledge systems can be beneficial for their own community's adaptation to climate change as expressions of self-determination as well as to non-Indigenous communities.

There are over 370 million indigenous peoples found across 90+ countries. Approximately 22% of the planet's land is indigenous territories, with this figure varying slightly depending on how both indigeneity and land-use are defined. Indigenous peoples play a crucial role as the main knowledge keepers within their communities. This knowledge includes that which relates to the maintenance of social-ecological systems.

Indigenous peoples have myriad experiences with the effects of climate change because of the wide-ranging geographical areas they inhabit across the globe and because their cultures and livelihoods tend to be tied to land-based practices and relations. These land-based practices can be useful when mitigating and adapting to climate change, especially if implemented on a larger scale.

== Background ==
Reports show that millions of people across the world will have to relocate due to rising seas, floods, droughts, and storms. While these conditions will affect people all over the world, the impact will disproportionately affect indigenous peoples.

Many indigenous farmers are noticing obvious changes in climate and nature, even though they're often not really familiar with the concept. Indigenous peoples have often relied on their own crop calendar depending on wind direction, blooming seasons, bird migrations, and other observable environmental factors for thousands of years. But after the global warming, farmers counting on traditional forecasting are feeling defenseless in front of nature's cycle changing. In addition, farmers with limited access to technology and modern forecast news won't be able to face unexpected weather changes like temperature variations or sudden precipitations.

All of these conditions are putting indigenous peoples under psychological and physical pressure. With regards to farming: "practices and traditions that have withstood thousands of years of civilizations rise and fall are becoming obsolete". This can carry a psychological toll for people who were using growing patterns in their farming methods that are often closely connected with local religious and cultural rites.

Indigenous peoples will be more acutely impacted by climate change than non-indigenous peoples for several reasons. Some of those reasons include:

- Indigenous communities geographically tend to be located in regions more vulnerable to climate change such as native rainforests, the Arctic, and coastal areas.
- Many indigenous cultures and lifestyles are linked directly to the environment, therefore the health of the environment in which they live is extremely important for their physical and spiritual well-being. Changing climates that alter the environment will have greater effects on people who depend on the environment directly, both spiritually and physically. Indigenous people will suffer more because of their deep connection to the land.
- The increased negative effects of climate change are also directly related to oppression and poverty and other issues caused by colonialism. This is because indigenous peoples have experienced a series of traumatic invasions. For example, "massacres, genocidal policies, disease pandemics, forced removal and relocation, Indian boarding school assimilation policies, and prohibition of spiritual and cultural practices have produced a history of ethnic and cultural genocide".
- Indigenous communities across the globe generally have economic disadvantages that are not as prevalent in non-indigenous communities due to the ongoing oppression they have experienced. These disadvantages include lower education levels and higher rates of poverty and unemployment, which add to their vulnerability to climate change.

Many studies suggest, however, that while they experience the effects at disproportionate levels, Indigenous peoples have a strong ability to adapt when it comes to the environmental changes caused by climate change, and there are many instances in which indigenous people are adapting. Their adaptability lies in the traditional knowledge within their cultures, which through "traumatic invasions" have been lost. The loss of traditional knowledge and oppression that indigenous people face pose a greater threat than the changing of the environment itself.

The United Nations Declaration on the Rights of Indigenous People recognizes that indigenous people have specific knowledge, traditional practices, and cultural customs that can contribute to the proper and sustainable management of ecological resources.

== Climate action of indigenous peoples ==
Indigenous peoples are working to prevent and combat the effects of climate change in a variety of ways, including through climate activism. Some examples of indigenous climate activists include Autumn Peltier, from Wiikwemkoong First Nation on Manitoulin Island in northern Ontario and Nina Gualinga from the Kichwa-speaking community of Sarayaku in the Ecuadorian Amazon.

Autumn Peltier, from Wiikwemkoong First Nation on Manitoulin Island in northern Ontario, has been a driving force in the fight to protect water in Canada's indigenous communities. Peltier is the chief water commissioner for the Anishinabek Nation, which advocates for 40 First Nations in Ontario. Peltier, who became water commissioner in 2019 at the age of 14, is rallying for action to protect indigenous waters and has become a part of the climate action movement.

Nina Gualinga has spent most of her life working to protect the nature and communities of the Ecuadorian Amazon. At 18, she represented indigenous youth before the Inter-American Court of Human Rights, helping to win a landmark case against the Ecuadorian government for allowing oil drilling on indigenous lands. She now advocates on the international stage for indigenous rights and a fossil-fuel-free economy. Gualinga recently received the World Wide Fund for Nature (WWF) International President's Youth Award, which acknowledges outstanding achievements by conservationists under the age of 30.

Indigenous communities are also working to combat the impacts of climate change on their communities through community initiatives. For example, Canadian Inuit community members of Rigolet, Nunatsiavut in Labrador are working to combat feelings of cultural disconnect through organizing the teaching of traditional skills in community classes, allowing people to feel more connected with their culture and each other. Additionally, Rigolet community members worked with researchers from the University of Guelph, to develop an app that allows community members to share their findings regarding the safety of local sea ice, as a way to reduce the anxiety surrounding the uncertainty of environmental conditions. Community members have identified these resources as valuable tools in coping with the ecological grief they feel as a result of climate change.

Additionally, indigenous communities and groups are working with governmental programs to adapt to the impacts climate change is having on their communities. An example of such a governmental program is the Climate Change and Health Adaptation Program (CCHAP) within the First Nations and Inuit Health Branch of Indigenous Services Canada. The Selkirk First Nation in Yukon worked with the CCHAP to undertake a project that focused on the relationship between the land, water and the people who rely on the fish camps for food security and to continue cultural practices that support the mental, physical, emotional and spiritual well-being of their people. The Confederacy of Mainland Miꞌkmaq's Mi'kmaw Conservation Group in Nova Scotia also worked with the CCHAP on a project involving conducting climate-related research, engaging community members, developing needs assessments and reporting on the state of climate change-related emergency plans. The Indigenous Climate Action (ICA) is also an organization that is the only indigenous climate justice organization in Canada. They implement "tools, education, and capacity needed to ensure indigenous knowledge is a driving force in climate solutions." Specifically, they held many demonstrations helping Teck withdraw from the Frontier Tar Sands Project.

== Benefits of indigenous peoples' participation in climate change research and governance ==
Historically, indigenous persons have not been included in conversations about climate change and frameworks for them to participate in research have not existed. For example, indigenous people in the Ecuadorian rainforest who had suffered a sharp decrease in biodiversity and an increase of greenhouse gas emissions due to the deforestation of the Amazon were not included in the 2005 Reducing emissions from deforestation and forest degradation (REDD+) project. This is especially difficult for Indigenous people because many can perceive changes in their local climate, but struggle with giving reasons for their observed change. Their inclusion in conversations about climate change and sustainability can offer useful solutions to this problem.

=== Indigenous knowledge ===
Critics of the program insist that Indigenous participation is necessary not only because they believe that it is necessary for social justice reasons, but also because indigenous groups are better at protecting their forests than national parks. This place-based knowledge rooted in local cultures, indigenous knowledge (IK), is useful in determining impacts of climate change, especially at the local level where scientific models often fail. Furthermore, IK plays a crucial part in the rolling-out of new environmental programs because these programs have a higher participation rate and are more effective when indigenous peoples have a say in how the programs themselves are shaped. Within IK there is a subset of knowledge referred to as traditional ecological knowledge (TEK). Indigenous knowledge is increasingly recognized as a dynamic system of environmental management, rather than merely a collection of traditional techniques, TEK is a collection of observations, practices and beliefs formed over time via interaction with local ecosystems. Scholars argue that TEK contributes to adaptive management by allowing communities to respond flexinby to environmental change through ongoing observation and knowledge transmission. Traditional ecological knowledge is being rediscovered as a means of adaptive management. TEK is the knowledge that indigenous peoples have accumulated through the passing of lessons and experiences from generation to generation. TEK is specific knowledge about the group's relationship with and their classifications of other living beings and the environment around them and it can be implemented to promote sustainable resource use.

In addition to its theoretical importance, Indigenous connections to land and the environment are integral parts of sustainability and examples of this are found all over the world within various indigenous tribes and communities. Within the Iñupiat tribal communities of Alaska, their spiritual connections to whales can provide insight into ecology and environmental changes due to their interactive knowledge, whilst also creating cultural identity. Climate change having the ability to change migration routes and population numbers threatens that identity, so the Iñupiat are preparing to adapt to these change within their community.

Implementing TEK is not as simple as it seems as some methods are not necessarily sustainable on a larger scale. There are also barriers to implementing Indigenous knowledge into scientific knowledge, often caused by relations between Indigenous communities and governments, but also within academia. Combining place-based indigenous knowledge with modern science creates a local and holistic plan in the creation of sustainable methods. It can also provide scientists with knowledge that is unfamiliar to them and difficult to retrieve. TEKs of drought-prone regions of the Andean Mountains in South America have led scientists to make forecasts about El Niño events, a compelling example of how both traditional knowledges and modern science can be intertwined and used in the pursuit against climate change.

An example of indigenous knowledge that could be implemented into wider sustainability methods is kelp farming and indigenous conservation in Cordova, Alaska. The sustainable use of seaweed by the native Eyak people, has the potential to be scaled up due to its ability to sequester carbon, combat ocean acidification and usage as an alternative to plastics. As well as fortifying the planet against climate change and protecting from damaging events such as oil spills, it encourages indigenous autonomy by creating a regenerative industry led by native peoples.

=== Governance ===
By extension, governance, especially climate governance, would benefit from an institutional linking to IK because it would hypothetically lead to increased food security. Such a linkage would also foster a shared sense of responsibility for the usage of the environment's natural resources in a way that is in line with sustainable development as a whole, but especially with the UN's Sustainable Development Goals. In addition, taking governance issues to indigenous people, those who are most exposed and disproportionately vulnerable to climate issues, would build community resilience and increase local sustainability, which would in turn lead to positive ramifications at higher levels. It is theorized that harnessing the knowledge of indigenous persons on the local level is the most effective way of moving towards global sustainability. Indigenous communities in Northern Australia have specific generational traditional knowledge about weather patterns and climatic changes. These communities have adapted to climate change in the past and have knowledge that non-indigenous people can utilize to adapt to climate change in the future. More recently, an increasing number of climate scientists and indigenous activists advocate for the inclusion of TEK into research regarding climate change policy and adaptation efforts for both indigenous and non-indigenous communities.

In 2008, the Centre for Biodiversity and Conservation of the American Museum of Natural History (AMNH) brought together a panel of indigenous leaders, indigenous knowledge scholars, and climate change scientists in order to discuss the role indigenous people have to play in climate change mitigation and how it can be implemented. The conference was titled Sustaining Cultural and Biological Diversity in a Rapidly Changing World: Lessons for Global Policy.

The Intergovernmental Panel on Climate Change (IPCC) emphasized their support for the inclusion of IK in their Special Report: Global Warming of 1.5 °C saying:

There is medium evidence and high agreement that indigenous knowledge is critical for adaptation, underpinning adaptive capacity through the diversity of indigenous agro-ecological and forest management systems, collective social memory, repository of accumulated experience and social networks...Many scholars argue that recognition of indigenous rights, governance systems and laws is central to adaptation, mitigation and sustainable development.

== By continent ==
=== Africa ===
Africa Regions Map

Climate change in Africa will lead to food insecurity, displacement of indigenous persons, as well as increased famine, drought, and floods. The impact of climate change in Africa falls disproportionately on indigenous people because they have limitations on their migration and mobility, are more negatively affected by decreased biodiversity, and have their agricultural land disproportionately degraded by climate change.

==== West Africa ====
In Nigeria, the Niger Delta has been reported to be the most climate-vulnerable region in Nigeria. Instances of flooding have been recorded annually especially in settlements along the Niger River and its tributaries and this overwhelmed many towns and resulted into the displacement of people from their homes. In Benin indigenous farmers have a history of adapting to diverse challenges, including climate shifts, pest pressures, and evolving policies, by adjusting their agricultural practices. For instance, changes in sowing dates due to climate variability have led to longer cropping seasons in Benin, posing time-inefficiency challenges. Factors like socio-economic status, farming techniques such as crop rotation, and the level of investment in farming significantly influence farmers' decisions to adjust their agricultural calendars in response to climate changes specifically in Benin. These insights highlight the need for targeted support, such as climate information dissemination and clear agricultural guidelines tailored to Benin's context, to help indigenous communities manage their farming practices efficiently amidst climate variability.

As a result of the frequent droughts, flooding, and drying up of water points throughout West Africa, there has been an increased conflict between farmers and herders. In the midst of these challenges, the Fulani people's indigenous and local knowledge illustrate effective climate adaptation techniques. Some of these techniques include livestock-feed diversification, cattle stress management techniques, and division of labor. Additionally, a shift from pastoralism to farming and an improvement of private rangeland has proved to reduce the increased conflict of flooding and droughts.

==== East Africa ====
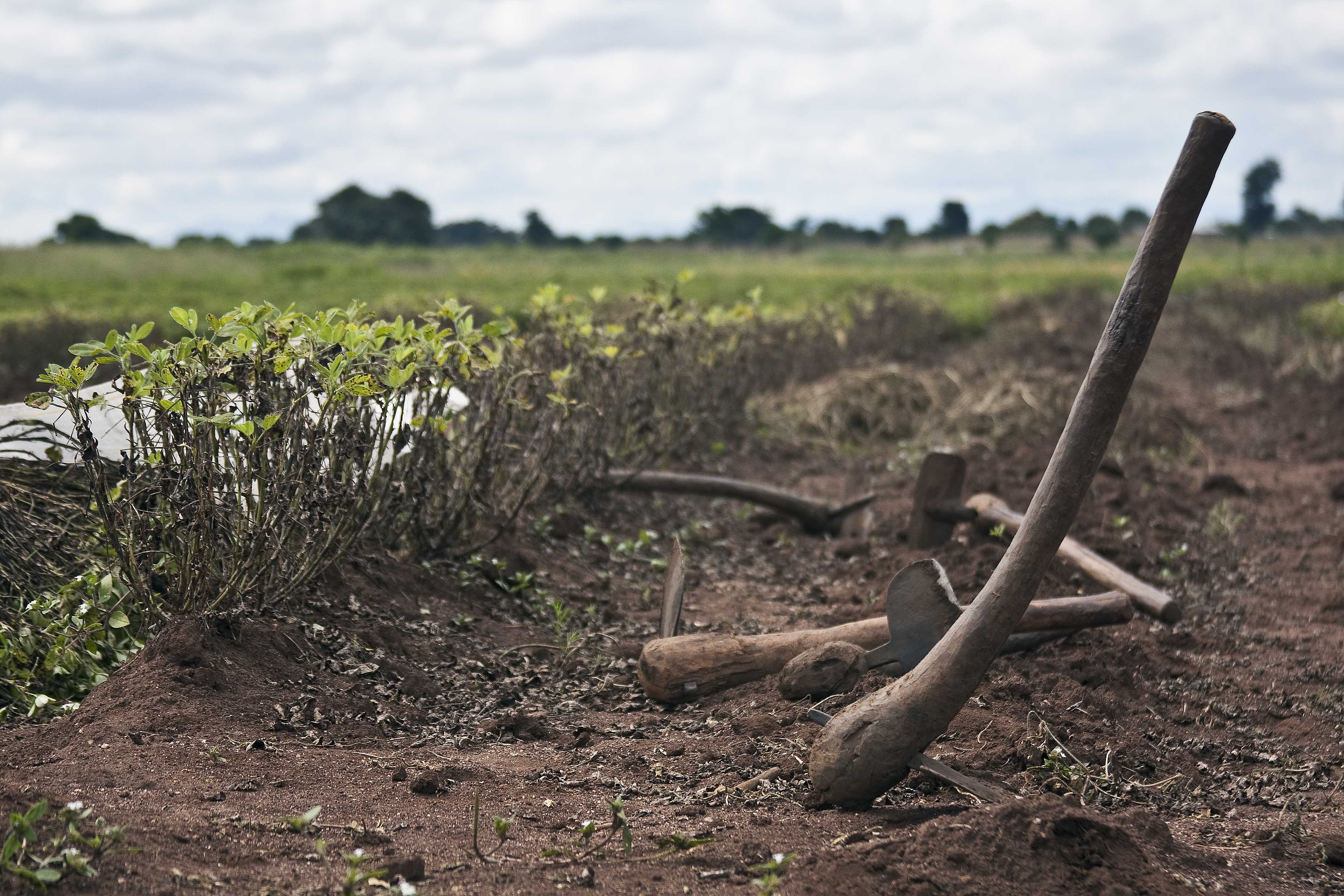
Farm tools from Malawi, where researchers studied Indigenous agriculture techniques.

East African indigenous communities, including the Tonga in Zambia, demonstrate a profound understanding of environmental conservation through practices such as selective harvesting, organic farming, and sacred water protection. These communities' sustainable approaches, rooted in totems and traditional knowledge, highlight the interconnectedness between human activities and the natural world, offering valuable insights in the face of climate change challenges. In Malawi, indigenous techniques such as intercropping maize with legumes enhance soil fertility and resilience to drought. Agroforestry methods, like planting trees alongside crops, provide shade and moisture retention, mitigating the impact of heat stress. The photo to the right depicting the farm tools used by Malawi farmers in Agroforestry.

Additionally, the Boorana people use observations of animal behaviors and entrails as well as celestial patterns to create weather and drought forecasting systems which have proved reliable amidst a fluctuating climate. Their resource-governance systems and traditional social insurance and safety net systems ensure ease of adaptation, which allow for acclimatization to drought challenges. Similarly, the Afar community's extensive biophysical observation allows for a perception of temperature trends and weather-forecasting systems that strengthen adaptation to climate change.

==== Northern Africa ====
Southern Egypt and northern Sudan, indigenous people still follow the Coptic calendar, which is an ancient pharaonic calendar used by farming populace. But nowadays, farmers are finding it hard to stand in front of climate change and its harsh impacts on nature. Normally, farmers in these regions would plant wheat at the end of August. But due to new high temperatures in this period, planting will be delayed and will affect the whole crop cycle. According to Ismail El Gizouli, a Sudanese scientist and former acting chair of the UN's Intergovernmental Panel on Climate Change (IPCC): "Until 20 years ago, this calendar was almost perfect," but now "due to climate change there is variability from one year to another." Indigenous communities in North Africa, such as the Maasai in Tanzania and the Barbaig in Manyara, are deeply impacted by the effects of climate change. They face prolonged droughts, food insecurity, and displacement from their traditional lands. These communities, whose livelihoods are often centered around nomadic pastoralism, are not only battling the immediate consequences of climate change but also grappling with long-standing issues of poverty and marginalization. The loss of grazing lands and water sources due to climate-induced changes further exacerbates the challenges faced by indigenous pastoralists, leading to conflicts over dwindling resources. Despite their sustainable land management practices, such as rotational grazing, indigenous communities are often excluded from decision-making processes and lack access to resources that could support their resilience to climate change. Efforts to address climate change in North Africa must prioritize the recognition of indigenous peoples' rights to land, resources, and self-determination, ensuring their inclusion in adaptation and mitigation strategies. Collaborative initiatives that combine traditional ecological knowledge with modern scientific approaches can enhance the resilience of indigenous communities in the face of climate-related challenges, while upholding indigenous rights and supporting community-led conservation efforts not only benefits these marginalized groups but also contributes to broader climate resilience and biodiversity conservation goals in North Africa.

==== Southern Africa ====
The southernmost countries within the continent of Africa are considered subtropical. Drought is one of the most significant threats posed by climate change to subtropical regions. Drought leads to subsequent issues regarding the agricultural sector which has significant effects on the livelihoods of populations within those areas. Pastoralists throughout the continent have coped with the aridity of the land through the adoption of a nomadic lifestyle to find different sources of water for their livestock. A more specific example of this phenomenon can be found in the Thaba Nchu, Mangaung District, South Africa. When assessing 301 smallholder farming households in the area using the Livelihood Vulnerability Index and climate data from 2010 to 2020 a study found that Central Thaba Nchu farming households are more vulnerable in terms of adaptive capacity and water resources compared to North and South Thaba Nchu. Additionally, Northern Thaba Nchu faces higher exposure and sensitivity to health-related challenges. The discussion of these groups aids in the overall understanding of how climate change affects indigenous practices and ways of life.

=== Arctic ===
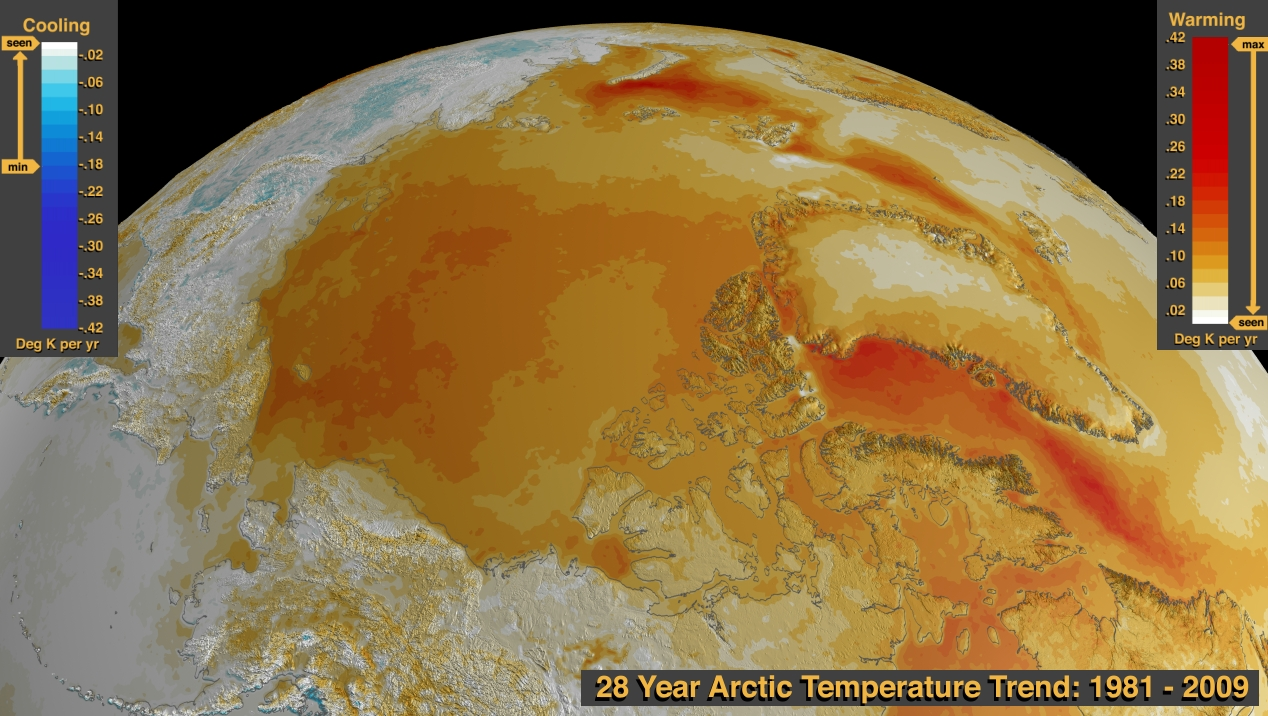
Arctic temperature warming

Climate change is having the most dramatic impact on the Arctic region. When compared to the rest of the world, temperatures are increasing at twice the magnitude. As a result, indigenous nations which exist in this region are facing unprecedented challenges. The eight Arctic nations (Note: The Arctic nations are: Canada, Denmark (Greenland), Finland, Iceland, Norway, Russia, Sweden and the United States (Alaska)) in total are responsible for 22% of total global carbon dioxide emissions. While these indigenous peoples exist within these Arctic nations, emissions are largely from oil and gas companies and other non-indigenous actors. Although indigenous nations in the Arctic have minimal responsibility in causing climate change, they cannot escape the effects. Many organizations who advocate for environmental justice, such as the Native Movement and the Environmental Justice Foundation, have brought attention to this disparity, ultimately arguing countries and corporations who are more responsible for climate change must take financial and ethical liability for existing damages.

According to the Kaya identity, four factors influence the aggregate global emission levels of carbon dioxide. These factors are increasing global population, gross domestic product (GDP) per capita, energy intensity, and carbon intensity. Before COVID-19 spread across the world, global population, GDP per capita, and carbon intensity were all increasing, while energy intensity was decreasing at a magnitude making global emission levels of carbon dioxide rise. However, COVID-19 has led to a decrease in carbon intensity and GDP per capita. Although carbon emissions have declined in 2020, the comprehensive long-term effect on reducing the increase of carbon dioxide concentration the atmosphere is minimal unless there are significant improvements in energy efficiency.

An increase in the global emission levels of carbon dioxide means significant arctic sea ice decline. The reduction of sea ice is currently not just impacting global temperature and the climate crisis. It is also significantly harming indigenous nations in unprecedented ways. Indigenous peoples in the Arctic include indigenous people who live in Canada, Greenland, the United States, Norway, and Russia. In Canada, there are nine major Inuit groups. They are the Labradormiut (Labrador Inuit), Nunavimmiut (Nunavik Inuit or Ungava Inuit), Nunatsiarmiut (Baffin Island Inuit), Iglulingmiut (Iglulik Inuit), Kivallirmiut (Caribou Inuit), Netsilingmiut (Netsilik), Inuinnait (Copper Inuit), Qikirtamiut (Sanikiluaq Inuit), and Inuvialuit (Western Arctic Inuit or Mackenzie Delta Inuit). While smaller in number, there are additionally non-Inuit indigenous nations in the northern regions of Canada, such as the Cree, Dene, and Innu peoples. In Greenland, indigenous people are Inuit. They comprise most of the population on the island. In the United States, Arctic indigenous peoples reside in Alaska. While there are many different ways to categorize them, they are often grouped regionally. In the south, there are the Yup'ik (Cup'ik), Eyak, Haida, Tlingit, and Tsimshian peoples. In the north, there are the St. Lawrence Island Yupik and Iñupiat peoples. The interior of Alaska is home to Athabascan peoples. The Alutiiq and Aleut (Unangax) peoples reside in the Aleutian Islands and south-central Alaska. The Sámi people exist in Norway, Finland, Sweden, and Russia, and are the only indigenous group within the European Union. There are more than 180 Indigenous peoples who reside in the land currently known as Russia. These include the Buryats, Enets, Evenks, Khakas, Komi, Oroks, Nenets, and Yakuts. Iceland is the sole Arctic country which does not have any indigenous nations as its citizens are mostly descended from northern Europeans. Because of melting ice, rising sea level, increased erosion, and loss of traditional food and hunting due to climate change, all of these indigenous groups are at great risk.

For the Sámi people, their relationship with reindeer is also at risk. Reindeer pastoralism has helped the Sámi people survive for centuries. The Sámi who reside in Finnmark, a geographical area in Northern Norway, may seeing changes to this process due to climate change. Climate projections reveal many scenarios over the 21st century in which regional and local areas may no longer have proper conditions to raise and profit off of reindeer. Traditionally, Sámi herders would react to environmental changes by moving to a more advantageous area with ideal snow conditions, temperatures, and other ecological resources. However, in modern times, resilience is no longer an option. Economic and legal barriers imposed on the Sámi by Norway, loss of habitat, and significant loss of snow all hamper the Sámi nation's ability to respond to these changes. There is also much uncertainty regarding climate change. Climate change may lead to even more unexpected difficulties in sustaining this traditional practice. Reindeer are not only economically important to the Sámi, but they are also a core part of their culture. Reindeer inspired and continue to inspire sounds, festivals, language, and storytelling. In order to help the Sámi as much as possible, Scandinavian countries and the international community must acknowledge both their traditional knowledge systems and ways of life and their right to be present at the decision-making table.

=== Asia ===
Indigenous people in Asia are plagued with a wide variety of problems due to climate change, including but not limited to, lengthy droughts, floods, irregular seasonal cycles, typhoons and cyclones with unprecedented strength, and highly unpredictable weather. This has led to worsening food and water security, which in turn factor into an increase in water-borne diseases, heat strokes, and malnutrition. Indigenous lifestyles in Asia have been completely uprooted and disrupted due to the above factors, but also due to the increased expansion of mono-culture plantations, hydroelectric dams, and the extraction of uranium on their lands and territories prior to their free and informed consent.

This can be further seen in the southern region of Asia where climate change-induced disasters like floods and droughts are causing significant challenges for indigenous communities, leading to food insecurity, displacement, and health crises. The vulnerability of South Asia to climate change is exacerbated by factors such as its dense population, poverty levels, and geographic features like major river systems from the Hindu Kush and Himalayas. Indigenous people in South Asia, traditionally reliant on agriculture, face threats to their food security due to changing weather patterns, water scarcity, and reduced crop yields caused by climate change. Extreme weather events, such as heatwaves and floods, are not only displacing indigenous populations but also straining already limited healthcare infrastructure in South Asia, leading to increased health risks. The combination of environmental challenges and inadequate response and rescue capacity from governments is intensifying the negative impacts of climate change on indigenous communities in South Asia.

Many indigenous communities in China also face challenges posed by climate change, though many adapt through traditional knowledge and farming methods. These communities, with knowledge already suited to various locations all with drastically different climates, may be more well suited to adapting to the changes inflicted by the climate crisis, though their methods and data face little recognition from western scientists.

Various indigenous communities in India combat climate instability by using their familiarity of the environment with traditional knowledge, local experience, and memories passed down through generations. The Lepcha community in India rely on traditional agroforestry systems to control temperature and microclimate during the summer season as well as the use of mulch to conserve soil moisture and manage soil temperature. This aids in combatting dry conditions and fluctuating climate extremes. Additionally, in India the community of Lachenpas and Dokpas use an intricate system of forecasting seasons derived from the phenological stages of local species. For example, bird migration is used to detect the beginning and end of monsoon season and altered rainfall patterns. These predictors are vital for their survival and decreasing the impact of climate change.

In southern Iraq, indigenous farmers still follow the steps of the Sumerians, agriculture pioneers since 6000 B.C. But recently, global warming affected crop cycle due to longer hotter summers. For example, August is the month of reducing grapes and producing grapes. But recently fruits are not appearing in their usual times. Also due to higher temperatures in September, farmers won't be able to move their buffalos from the water to avoid overheating them.

Older indigenous farmers who are using traditional farming methods may be confused by the changing climate and be unsure what and when to grow crops.

=== North America ===
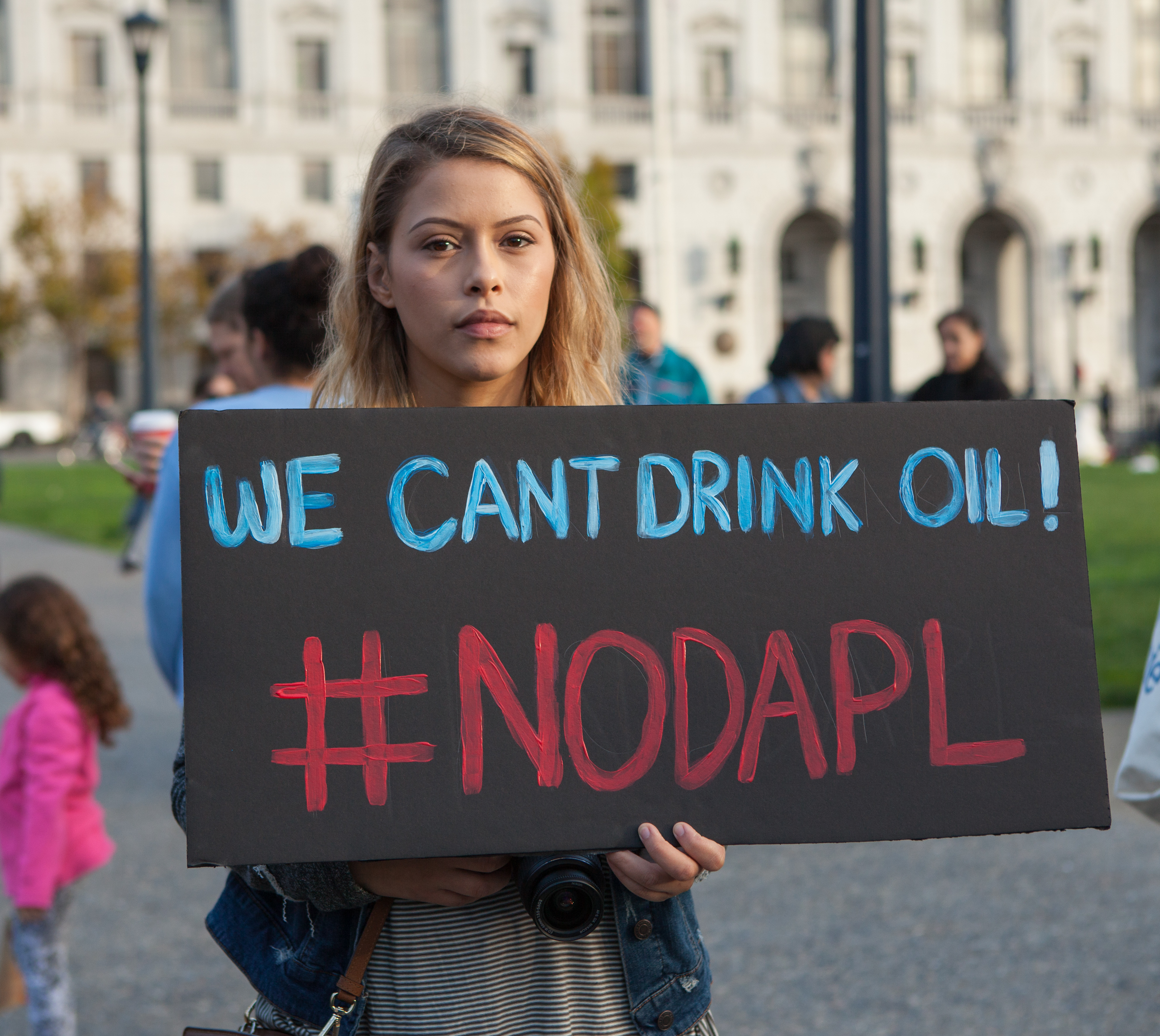
A person protesting the Dakota Access Pipeline holds a sign reading "We can't drink oil! #NoDAPL"

Effects of climate change on indigenous peoples in North America include temperature increases, precipitation changes, decreased glacier and snow cover, rising sea level, increased floods, droughts and extreme weather. Food and water insecurity, limited access to traditional foods and locations, and increased exposure to infectious diseases may result from these changes.

One in four Native Americans face food insecurity. North American peoples, such as the Inuit, rely on subsistence activities like hunting, fishing, and gathering. 15-22% of the diet in some indigenous communities is from a variety of traditional foods. These activities are important to the survival of tribal culture, and to the collective self-determination of a tribe. Indigenous North American diets consist of staple foods like wild rice, shellfish, beans, moose, deer, berries, caribou, walrus, corn, squash, fish, and seal. The effects of climate change—including changes in the quality and availability of freshwater, the changing migratory patterns of staple species, and the increased rarity of native plant species—have made it increasingly difficult for tribes to subsist on their traditional diets and participate in their culturally important activities. The traditional diets of indigenous North Americans also provide essential nutrients. In the absence of these essential staples—and often because the populations reside in "food deserts" and are subject to poverty—Native Americans living on reservations are subject to higher levels of detrimental diet-related diseases such as diabetes, obesity, and heart disease. In some Native American counties in the United States, 20% of children aged 2–5 are obese.

The indigenous populations in the United States and Canada are communities that are disproportionately vulnerable to the effects of climate change due to socioeconomic disadvantages. These environmental changes will have implications on the lifestyle of indigenous groups which include, but are not limited to, Alaska Natives, Inuit, Dene, and Gwichʼin people. There are higher rates of poverty, lower levels of access to education, to housing, and to employment opportunities in indigenous communities than there are in non-indigenous communities within North America. These conditions increase indigenous communities' vulnerability and sensitivity to climate change. These socioeconomic disadvantages not only increase their vulnerability and in some cases exposure, they also limit indigenous groups' capacity to cope with and recover from the harmful effects climate change brings. Indigenous farming practices, deeply rooted in millennia-old wisdom, are facing unprecedented challenges as climate change disrupts traditional seasons and weather patterns. Communities like the Hopi tribesmen of northern Arizona, who historically relied on natural indicators for successful farming, are now grappling with failed forecasts and unpredictable conditions. This shift not only threatens their agricultural sustainability but also undermines longstanding cultural and spiritual connections to the land, highlighting the urgent need for adaptive strategies and support in the face of climate-induced disruptions.

Some of the solutions proposed for combating climate change in North America like coal pollution mitigation, and genetically modified organism (GMO) foods actually violate the rights of indigenous peoples and ignore what is in their best interest in favor of sustaining economic prosperity in the region. Additionally, many tribal communities have already faced the need to relocate or protect against climate change (such as sea level rise), but there is a general lack of funds and dedicated government-supported programs to assist tribal communities in protecting themselves from climate change and resettlement, which can result in the further erosion of indigenous cultures and communities. Furthermore, the loss of biodiversity in the region has severely limited the ability of indigenous peoples to adapt to changes in their environment. Such uncertainties and changes in livelihood and even culture, alongside the destruction of culturally significant ecosystems and species, can negatively affect people's mental health and "sense of place."

Additionally, increases in temperature threatens cultural practices. Many indigenous ceremonies involve going for days without food or water, which can become health and even life threatening in increasingly hot temperatures.

An important topic to consider when looking at the intersection of climate change and indigenous populations is having an indigenous framework and understanding indigenous knowledge. Because of the direct effect climate change has on the livelihoods of many indigenous peoples and their connection to the land and nature, these communities have developed various indigenous knowledge systems. Indigenous knowledge refers to the collective knowledge that has been accumulated and evolved across multiple generations concerning people's relationship to the environment. These knowledge systems are becoming increasingly important within the conversations surrounding climate change because of the long timeline of ecological observations and regional ecological understanding. However, there are dangers which come with sharing them. Traditional knowledge is often a part of an indigenous population's spiritual identity, and misuse of it can lead to disrespect and exploitation of their culture, thus some may be hesitant to share their knowledge. However, an example of the ways indigenous knowledge has been used effectively to understand climate change is the monitoring of the Arctic by Alaska Natives. Their knowledge has been used to monitor changes in animal behavior and weather patterns, as well to develop ways of adapting in a shifting environment.

In reaction to the environmental changes within North American tribal communities, movements of indigenous activism have organized and risen to protest against the injustices enforced upon them. A notable and recent example of indigenous activism revolves around the #NoDAPL movement. "On April 1st, tribal citizens of the Standing Rock Lakota Nation, and other Lakota, Nakota, and Dakota citizens founded a spirit camp along the proposed route of the Dakota Access Pipeline" to object against the installment of an oil pipeline through indigenous land. Another example would be in Northwestern Ontario, where indigenous peoples of the Asubpeeschoseewagong First Nation (Grassy Narrows First Nation) have protested against clearcutting in their territory. Tribes in the state of Washington that rely on fish have protested against overfishing and habitat destruction. Indigenous environmental activism against effects of climate change and forces that facilitate ongoing damaging effects to tribal land, aims to correct their vulnerability and disadvantaged status, while also contributing to the broader discussion of tribal sovereignty. In efforts to promote acknowledgement of indigenous tribes in accordance with indigenous environmental activism, indigenous scientists and organizations, such as the American Indian Science and Engineering Society, have made note of the importance of incorporating indigenous sciences into efforts toward sustainability.,

==== United States ====
According to Indigenous scholars such as Daniel Wildcat, Zoe Todd, and Kyle Whyte, the experience of modern climate change echoes previous experiences of environmental damage and territorial displacement brought about by European settlement. Colonial practices such as damming and deforestation forced Indigenous peoples to adapt to unfamiliar climates and environments. Thus, the impacts of global climate change are viewed as being not separate from but rather an intensification of the impacts of settler colonialism.

Indigenous scholars and activists argue that colonialist policies—prioritizing exploitation and commoditization of resources over Indigenous teachings favoring environmental stability and seeking a symbiotic relation with nature—have fueled climate change. The United Nations Department of Economic and Social Affairs has stated that "Indigenous peoples are among the first to face the direct consequences of climate change, due to their dependence upon, and close relationship, with the environment and its resources." More specifically, North American tribes' present-day lands are on average more exposed to extreme heat and receive less precipitation, nearly half of tribes experience heightened wildfire hazard exposure, and tribes' present-day lands have less mineral value potential.

Native peoples residing on the Gulf and West Coasts are affected by the rising sea temperatures because that makes the fish and shellfish, that they rely on for food and cultural activities, more susceptible to contamination. In California, climate change has wiped out much of the salmonids and acorns that were a significant portion of the Karuk people's traditional diet. Exploitation practices produce pollution and introduce non-native species, promoting the intensity of climate change. Conservation efforts of the Great Lakes ecosystems are necessary in order to prevent climate change from doing further damage to the environment and the Indigenous communities living there. Increasing temperatures have stunted the growth of wild rice, negatively impacting the Anishinaabe and Ojibwe people's health and culture. The Navajo Nation will experience increasing droughts and air pollution from dust. In Arizona, rising temperatures and more severe rain events will likely exacerbate existing water purity problems, resulting in increased diarrhea and stomach problems, especially among children. In Maine, habitat loss and increasing temperatures, especially in the colder seasons, encourage the survival of ticks. This harms moose populations that Indigenous people have historically relied on.

The Status of Tribes and Climate Change (STACC) report is a US-based report informing on indigenous impacts to climate change, indigenous methods that offer solutions, and how these methods can be implemented in a well-informed and appropriate way. Established in 1992, it takes into consideration Indigenous land sovereignty and personal narratives from Indigenous peoples to ensure that mitigation and adaptation of climate change involves Indigenous people and practices.

==== Canada ====
Inuit who reside in Canada are facing significant difficulty maintaining their traditional food systems because of climate change. The Inuit have hunted mammals for hundreds of years. Many of their traditional economic transactions and cultural ceremonies were and still are centred around whales and other marine mammals. Climate change is causing the ocean to warm up and acidify, negatively impacting these species in these traditional areas and causing many to move elsewhere. While some believe a warming Arctic would cause food insecurity, already a problem for Canadian Inuit, to increase by taking away some of their primary food sources, others point to the resilience they have displayed in the past to changing temperatures and believe they will likely be able to adapt. Although ancestors to the modern Inuit would travel to other places in the Arctic based on these animals and adapt to changing migration routes, modern geopolitical boundaries and laws would likely prevent this from happening to the extent necessary to preserve these traditional food systems. Regardless of whether they can successfully modify their marine food systems, they will lose certain aspects of their culture. To hunt these whales and other marine mammals, they have used the same traditional tools for generations. Without these animals providing them subsistence, a core part of their culture would become obsolete.

The Inuit are also losing their access to ringed seal and polar bears, two key animals that are essential to the traditional Inuit diet. Climate change has led to drastic drops in the ringed seal population, which has led to serious harm to the Inuit subsistence winter economy. The ringed seal is the most prevalent subsistence species in all of Nunavut, with respect to both land and water. Without the ringed seal, the Inuit would lose their sense of ningiqtuq, or their cultural form of resource sharing. Ringed seal meat is one of the core meats of this type of sharing and has been utilized in this system for hundreds of years. With climate change, ningiqtuq would be drastically altered. Also, the ringed seal embodies the ideals of sharing, unity, and collectivism because of ningiqtuq. Its decline signifies loss of Inuit identity. The polar bear population is also declining because of climate change. Polar bears rely on ringed seals for food, so both of their declines are correlated. This decline is also harming ningiqtuq as polar bear meat is shared among Inuit.

For the Gwichʼin people, an Anthabaskan-speaking First Nations in Canada, caribou are central to their culture. They have coexisted with the Gwichʼin for thousands of years. As a result, their entire culture is at immediate risk. Caribou numbers are rapidly declining due to warmer temperatures and melting ice. Sarah James, a prominent Alaskan Gwichʼin activist, said, "We are the caribou people. Caribou are not just what we eat; they are who we are. They are the stories and songs and the whole way we see the world. Caribou are our life. Without caribou, we wouldn't exist."

=== Oceania ===
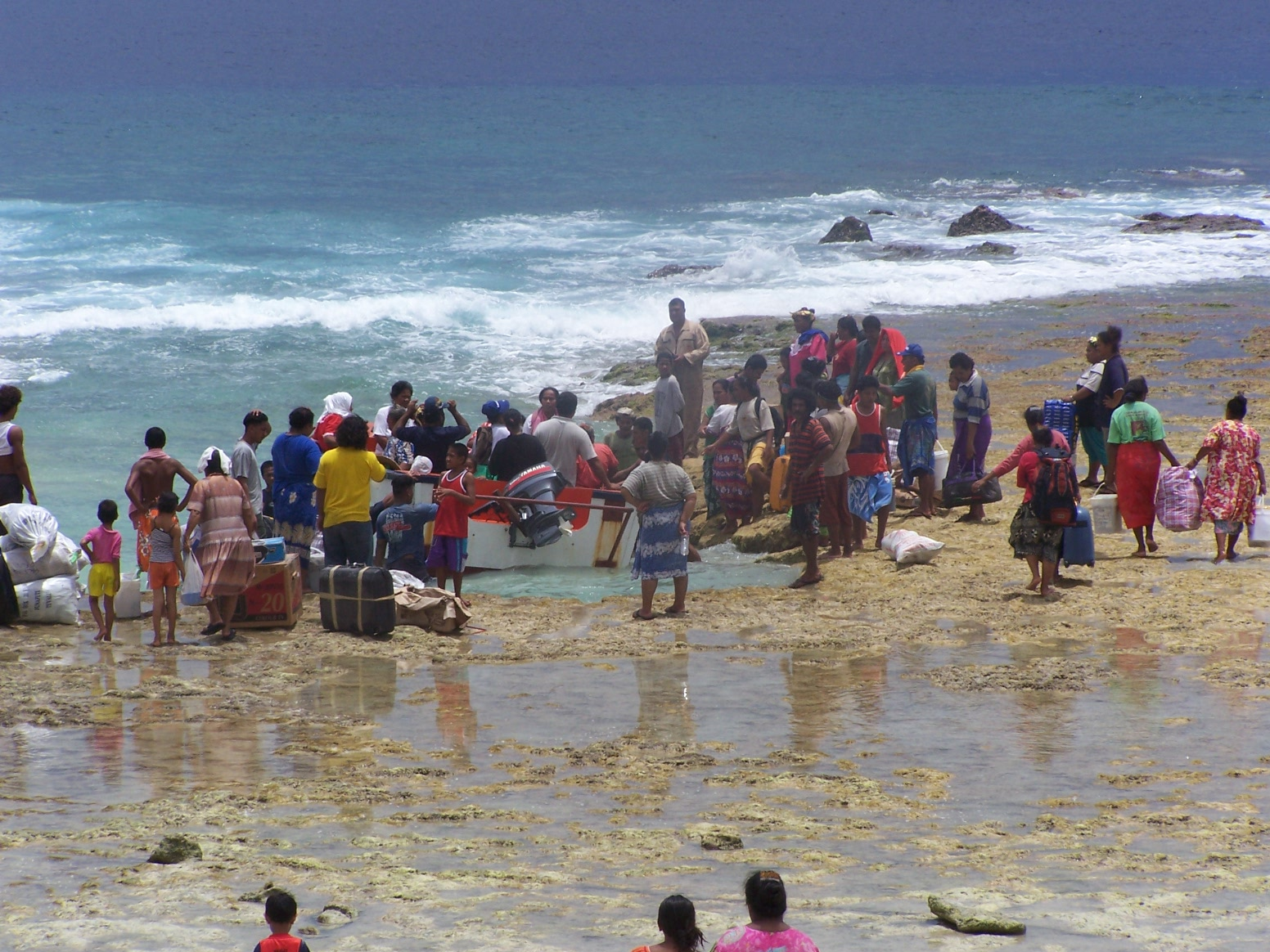
Cargo arrival at the sinking island of Tuvalu, South Pacific.

The Pacific region is characterized by low elevation and insular coastlines, making it severely susceptible to the increased sea-level and erosion effects of climate change. Entire islands have sunk in the Pacific region due to climate change, dislocating and killing indigenous persons. Furthermore, the region suffers from continually increasing frequency and severity of cyclones, inundation and intensified tides, and decreased biodiversity due to the destruction of coral reefs and marine ecosystems. This decrease in biodiversity is coupled with a decreased populations of the fish and other sea life the indigenous people of the region rely upon for food. Indigenous people of the region are also losing many of its food sources, such as sugarcane, yams, taro, and bananas, to climate change as well as seeing a decrease in the amount of drinkable water made available from rainfall.

Many Pacific island nations have a heavy economic reliance upon the tourism industry. Indigenous people are not outside of the economic conditions of a nation, therefore they are impacted by the fluctuations of tourism and how that has been impacted by climate change. Pacific coral reefs are a large tourist attraction and with the acidification and warming of the ocean due to climate change, the coral reefs that many tourists want to see are being bleached leading to a decline in the industry's prosperity.

According to Rebecca Tsosie, a professor known for her work in indigenous peoples' human rights, the effects of the global climate change are especially visible in Pacific region of the world. She cites the indigenous peoples' strong and deeply interconnected relationship with their environment. This close relationship brings about a greater need for the indigenous populations to adapt quickly to the effects of climate change because of how reliant they are upon the environment around them.

==== Australia ====
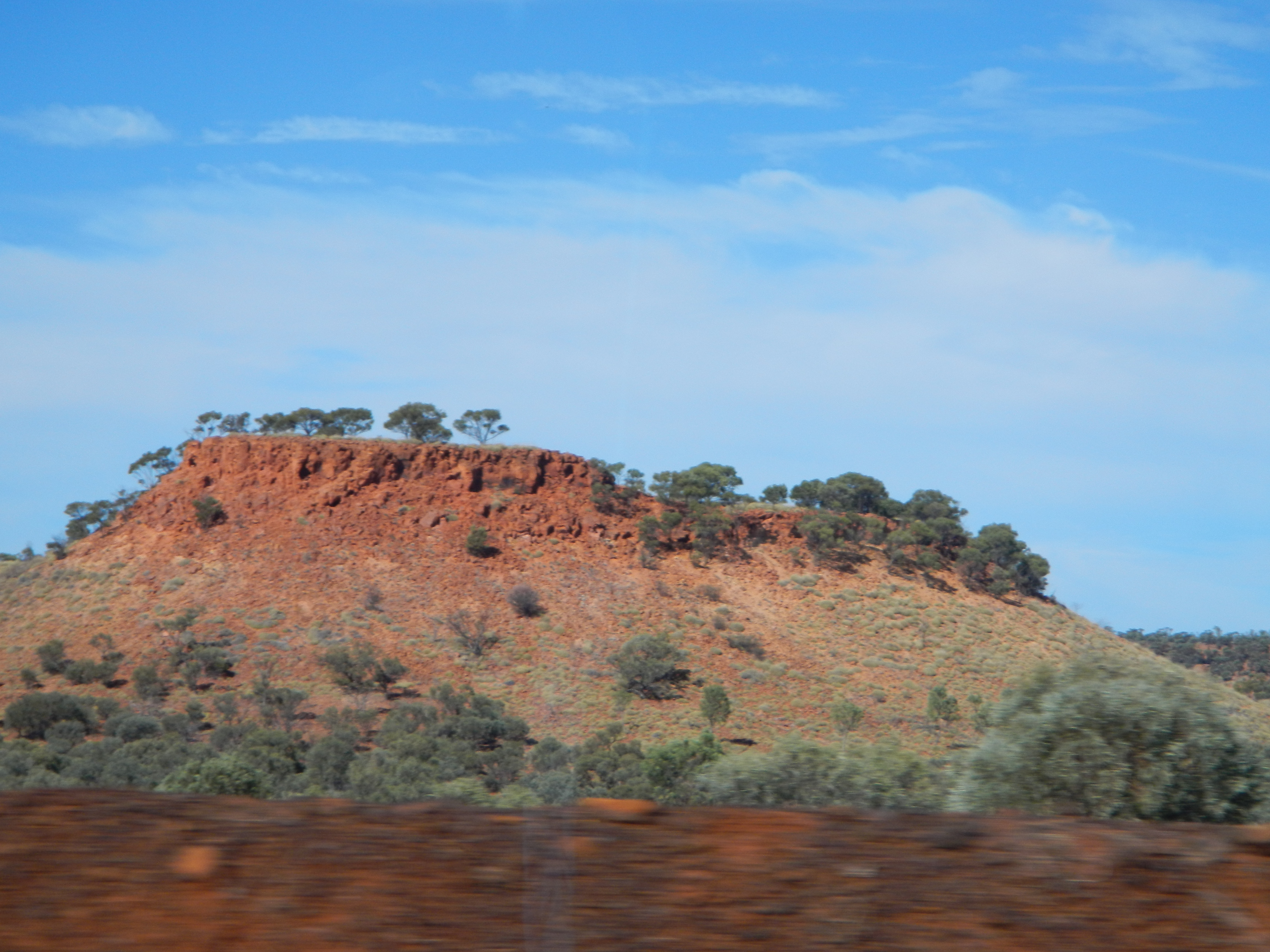
Many Aboriginal people live in rural and remote areas across Australia which are threatened by heat waves and droughts, worsened by climate change.

Many Aboriginal people live in rural and remote agricultural areas across Australia, especially in the Northern and Southern areas of the continent. There are a variety of different climate impacts on different Aboriginal communities which includes cyclones in the northern region and flooding in Central Australia which negatively impacts cultural sites and therefore the relationship between indigenous people and the places that hold their traditional knowledge.

Some of these changes include a rise in sea levels, getting hotter and for a longer period of time, and more severe cyclones during the cyclone season. Climate issues include wild fires, heat waves, floods, cyclones, rising sea-levels, rising temperatures, and erosion. The communities most affected by climate changes are those in the North where Indigenous Australians and Torres Strait Islanders make up 30% of the population. Aboriginal and Torres Strait Islander communities located in the coastal north are the most disadvantaged due to social and economic issues and their reliance on their traditional lands for food, culture, and health. This has begged the question for many community members in these regions, should they move away from this area or remain present.

Strategies to adapt to climate change are evident in indigenous communities all throughout Australia. For example, the Lajamanu and the Mirriwong communities practice regular patch burning on specific species and individual times of the day and seasons to decrease the vegetation density which reduces the risk of wildfire. These patch burns also stimulate the growth of fresh grass and bush food which increases access for land and waterways for wildlife. These practices conserve plants and animal species. Additionally, the Mirriwong people use riparian vegetation to decrease the temperatures for aquatic life and combat dangerous temperatures during hot season.

Indigenous people have always responded and adapted to climate change, including indigenous people of Australia. Aboriginal Australian people have existed in Australia for tens of thousands of years. Due to this continual habitation, Aboriginal Australians have observed and adapted to climatic and environmental changes for millennia which uniquely positions them to be able to respond to current climate changes. Though these communities have shifted and changed their practices overtime, traditional ecological knowledge (TEK) exists that can benefit local and indigenous communities today. Indigenous people have not been offered many opportunities or provided with sufficient platforms to influence and contribute their traditional knowledge to the creation of current international and local policies associated to climate change adaptation.

=== Latin America ===
==== Indigenous peoples' backgrounds ====
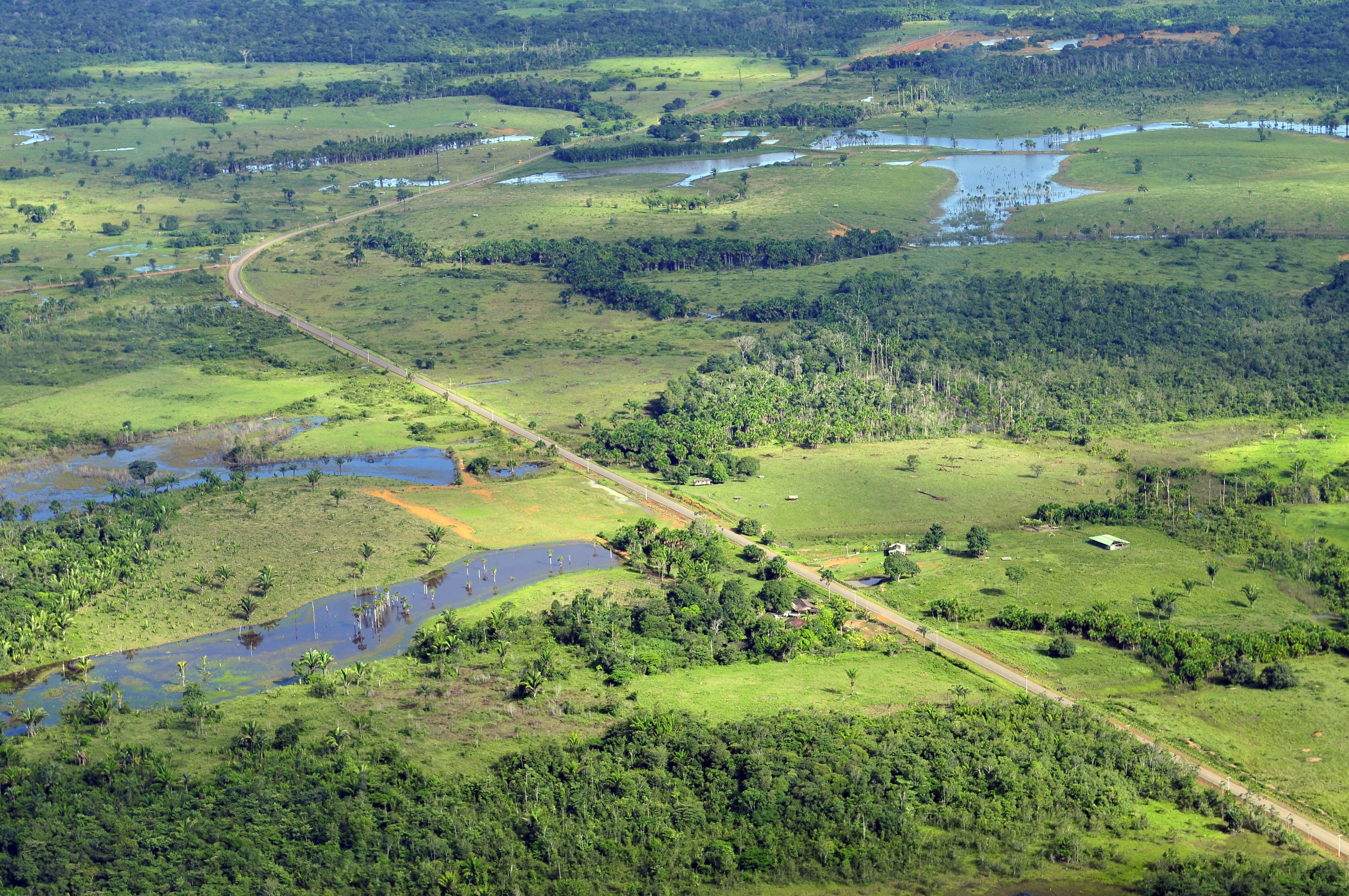
Amazon Deforestation near Manaus, the capital of the Brazilian state of Amazonas

Although some cultures thrive in urban settings like Mexico City or Quito, Indigenous peoples in Latin America populate most of the rural poor areas in countries such as Ecuador, Brazil, Peru and Paraguay. Indigenous people consist of 40 million of the Latin American-Caribbean populations. This makes these populations extremely susceptible to threats of climate change due to socioeconomic, geographic, cultural, and political factors. Formal education is limited in these areas which caps contributions of skills to the market economy. Mostly living in the Amazon rainforest, there are more than 600 ethnographic-linguistic identities living in the Latin American region. This distinction of cultures provides different languages, world-views, and practices that contribute to indigenous livelihoods.

==== Impacts of climate change on Indigenous peoples ====
Humans have impacted climate change through land use, extractive practices, and resource use. Not only have humans exacerbated climate change, our actions are threatening the livelihoods of indigenous peoples in targeted and susceptible areas. Specifically, extractive industries in the Amazon and the Amazon basin are threatening the livelihood of indigenous persons by land use and exacerbating climate change. These extractive policies were originally implemented without the consent of indigenous people are now being implemented without respect to the rights of indigenous people, specifically in the case of reducing emissions from deforestation and forest degradation (REDD). Not only do deforestation and fragmentation of forests negatively affect the areas and livelihoods of inhabitants, but contributes to the release of more carbon into the atmosphere, as the trees provided as carbon sinks, which exacerbates climate change even more. Thus, deforestation has and will continue to have disproportionate effects on indigenous people in Latin American tropical forests, including the displacement of these communities from their native lands. Also, in the Amazon Basin where fish are a main resource, precipitation and flooding greatly impact fish reproduction drastically. Likewise, this inconsistency in precipitation and flooding has affected, and decreased the reproduction of fish and turtles in the Amazon River. Furthermore, climate change has altered the patterns of migratory birds and changed the start and end times of wet and dry seasons, further increasing the disorientation of the daily lives of indigenous people in Latin America.

Climate changed caused by humans will likely have a devastating effect on indigenous languages in the Amazon rainforest basin. Approximately 20% of global endangered languages are found in the region and the loss of ancestral lands will likely hinder the preservation of indigenous languages, leading to a cultural crisis which could threaten "ancient knowledge, cultural heritage, and an entire sense of community."

As most of the contributions and the roles of combating climate change, the rights and resources of indigenous peoples often go unrecognized, these communities face disproportionate and the most negative repercussions of climate change and from conservation programs. Due to the close relationship with nature and indigenous peoples, they are among the first to face the repercussions of climate change and at a large devastating degree.

==== Gender inequality ====
Indigenous peoples suffer disproportionately from the impacts of climate change, women even more so. Discrimination and some customary laws hinder political involvement, making numbers for indigenous women extremely low. Although indigenous women's involvement still lag behind, countries such as Bolivia, Ecuador, Guatemala, Mexico, Nicaragua, and Peru have improved their political participation of indigenous peoples. Furthermore, women often face strenuous physical labor. To reduce harm, improve health of humans and the environment, a nongovernmental organization in Brazil introduced an eco-stove that eliminates the need for heavy fuelwood for energy and to cook. This has empowered indigenous women in Brazil and surrounding areas as around 53,000 people have the opportunity to live healthier and easier lives.

==== Adaptation strategies ====
Due to indigenous peoples' extensive knowledge and ability to predict and interpret weather patterns and conditions, these populations are vital to adaptation and survival of posed climate threats. From hundreds of years experimenting with nature and developing inherently sustainable cultural strategies has allowed indigenous peoples to pass on their knowledge to future generations. This has made indigenous peoples crucial to understanding the relationship between nature, people, and conserving the environment. In Latin America and the Caribbean, indigenous peoples are restructuring and changing agricultural practices in adaptation to climate changes. They are also moving and relocating agriculture activities from drought inflicted areas to areas with more suitable, wetter areas. It is imperative for the Americas and the Caribbean to continue pursuing conservation of the environment as 65% of indigenous land has not been developed intensely.

==== Policy and global action ====
After the Zapatista movement in Mexico in the mid-1990s, indigenous issues were recognized internationally and the start of progress for indigenous political involvement and recognition. Bearing the best political representation, Bolivia, Ecuador, and Venezuela have the largest political representation, Mexico being recognized as having the largest gap in proportion to representation and population. International treaties and goals like the 2030 Agenda for Sustainable Development, the Paris Agreement, and the Addis Ababa Action Agenda have recognized the rights of indigenous peoples.

Women play a crucial role in combating climate change especially in indigenous culture, and it is imperative to recognize strong leadership and their successes. Despite the threats of climate change, indigenous women have risen up and pushed for sustainable solutions at local and global scales.

==== Caribbean ====
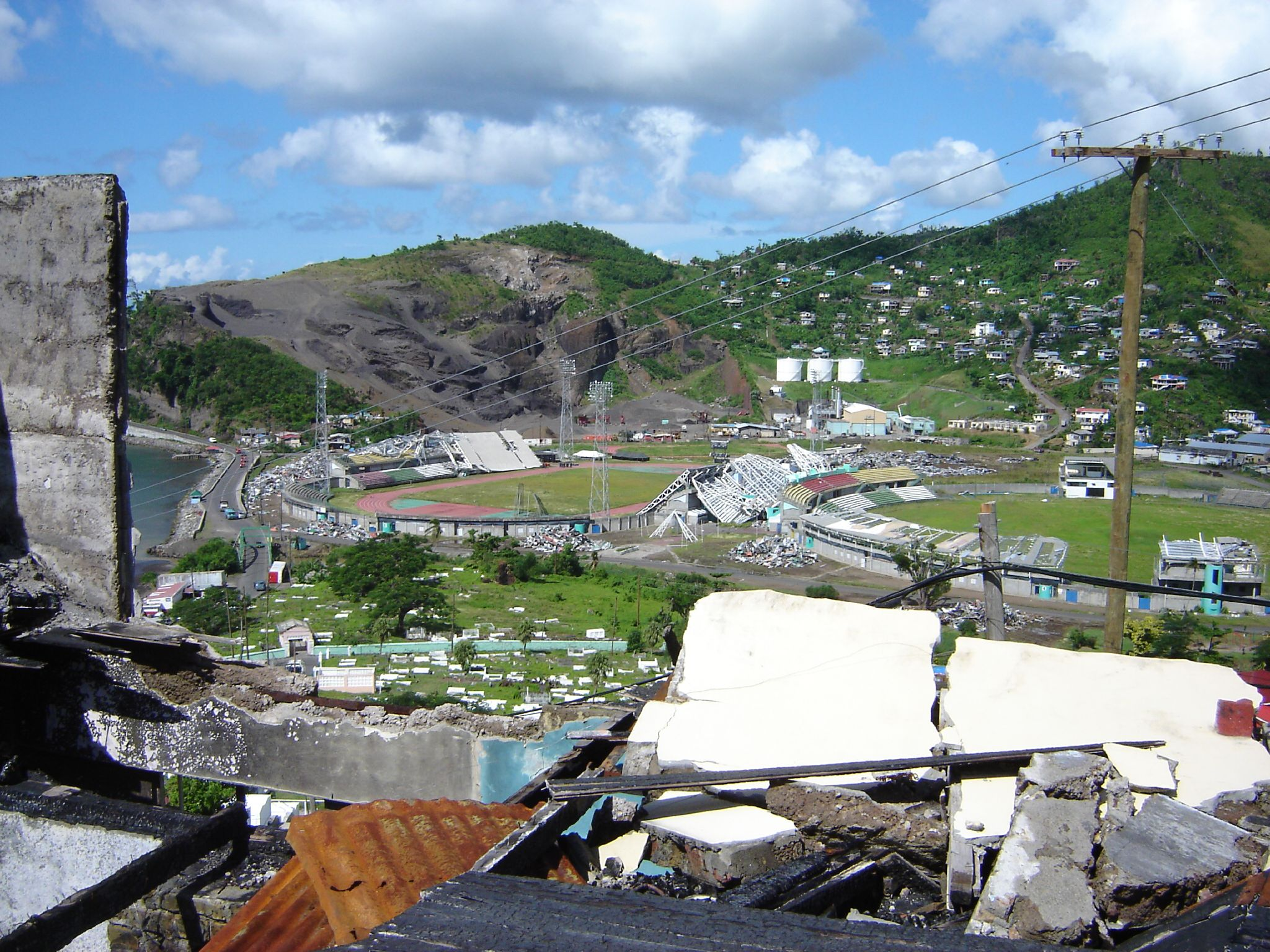
Devastation in Grenada as a result of Hurricane Ivan. Illustrates infrastructural damage.

The impacts of climate change are taking a disproportionate toll on indigenous peoples, when indigenous peoples contribute least to climate change. The main effect of climate change in the Caribbean region is the increased occurrence of extreme weather events. There have been an influx of flash floods, tsunamis, earthquakes, extreme winds, and landslides in the region. These events have led to wide-ranging infrastructural damage to both public and private property for all. For example, Hurricane Ivan inflicted damage totalling 135% of Grenada's GDP to Grenada, setting the country back an estimated ten years in development. The effects of these events are most strongly felt, however, by indigenous persons, who have been forced to move to the most extreme areas of the country due to the lasting effects that colonialism had on the region. In these extreme regions, extreme weather events are even more pronounced, leading to crop and livestock devastation. Also, in the Caribbean, people have reported erosion of beaches, less beach access, a reduction in vegetation, a noticeable rise in sea-level, and rivers that are drying up. Erosion to beaches and coastlines as well as vegetation loss is partly due to increased built development along vulnerable coastlines throughout the Caribbean, which is generally related to the expanding tourism industry and increased human activity.

In 2005 an extensive coral bleaching event occurred across the Caribbean, which was attributed to unusually high sea surface temperatures, which may or may not be attributable to climate change. Vast coral bleaching can have detrimental effects on the health of marine ecosystems and can lead to reduced fish stocks, which indigenous Caribbean peoples may rely on as a food source and way of income. Considering many regions in the Caribbean are water scarce and many Small Island Developing States rely on rainfall and groundwater water security has also become an issue.

Among changing agricultural practices, it is imperative for indigenous peoples and inhabitants of these regions to integrate disaster plans, national sustainable development goals and environmental conservation into daily lives. As indigenous lands are constantly under attack, from governments to industries, it is imperative for indigenous peoples to partner with groups such as the Rainforest Alliance to fight and protest for indigenous rights. The Caribbean region has been focusing on capacity-building needs to further enable indigenous peoples to utilize their traditional knowledge to build community resilience to climate change.
