= Romani feminism =

Movement for Romani women's rights

One of the symbols of Romani feminism

Romani feminism, or Gypsy feminism, is a form of feminism that promotes gender equality for Romani women while making these processes compatible with the preservation of the culture and values of the Romani people. It is closely related to the Romani women's movement.

Romani feminism is characterized by the fight to overcome prejudices and the distinction towards both Roma society and towards women, in addition to the stigma associated with poverty.

== History ==
Throughout history, the Romani ethnic group has been despised and persecuted by different societies. Despite this, the group continues to preserve a characteristic culture, with its own language, traditions and customs, and a strong sense of family and cohesion.

In the 1920s and 1930s there was early Romani political activism in central Europe; this included the proposal of a female-only branch of the nascent General Union of Roma in Romania to educate and empower Romani women. The first Panhellenic Association of Roma People was founded by two women in 1939.

There were organizations formed to organize for Roma rights since at least the 1960s, but the movement was popularized in the 1990s following the end of the Cold War. In the same decade, a number of Romani women led national campaigns against gender-based oppression in relation to Roma communities. One of the first explicitly Roma women’s organizations, the Gypsy Mother Association, was established in Hungary in 1991 by Ilona Zambo. In the United Kingdom, Sylvia Dunn formed the National Association of Gypsy Women in 1994. The European Union sponsored the First Congress of Roma from the European Union in May 1994 in Seville, Spain, but was criticized for not including Romani women's participation in the final report. In September 1996, the Women's Association from Romania (RWAR), the first women's organisation in Romania, was established.

The late 1990s saw the formation and involvement of several non-governmental organizations. For example, the Open Society Institute (OSI) – later renamed to the Open Society Foundation – provided funding for the European Roma Rights Centre, which opened in 1996, and held its first International Conference of Romani Women in 1998. OSI also supported the Association of Romani Women in Romania's formation of the International Conference for Roma Women in December 1999.

At the Primer Congreso Gitano de la Unión Europea (First Gypsy Congress of the European Union) in 1994, a group of 29 Romani women issued the Manifesto of Roma/Gypsy Women; as a result, the Council of Europe organized a hearing for Romani women's rights in 1995.

In 2002, the International Romani Women’s Network (IRWN) was launched by Romani women activists from 18 countries, becoming the first registered international organization to represent women from all Romani groups in Europe. In June 2006, the European Parliament issued its first resolution on the Situation of Romani Women in the EU Member States with input from Romani women scholars and activists. The same year, the OSI combined programs supporting Roma women by the Women’s Program and the Roma Participation Program (RPP) to create the Joint Roma Women’s Initiative (JWRI). JWRI is generally seen as more radical, while IRWN is more conservative.

In 2012, historian Debra L. Schultz said in Central and Eastern Europe "there are probably no more than several hundred women who would self-identify as Romani women activists. Yet their influence is significant and growing, within and beyond the post-Soviet Romani rights movement." A Roma feminist (Soraya Post) was elected to the European Parliament for the first time in 2014. The First Congress of Romani Feminism was held in 2017.

=== In Spain ===
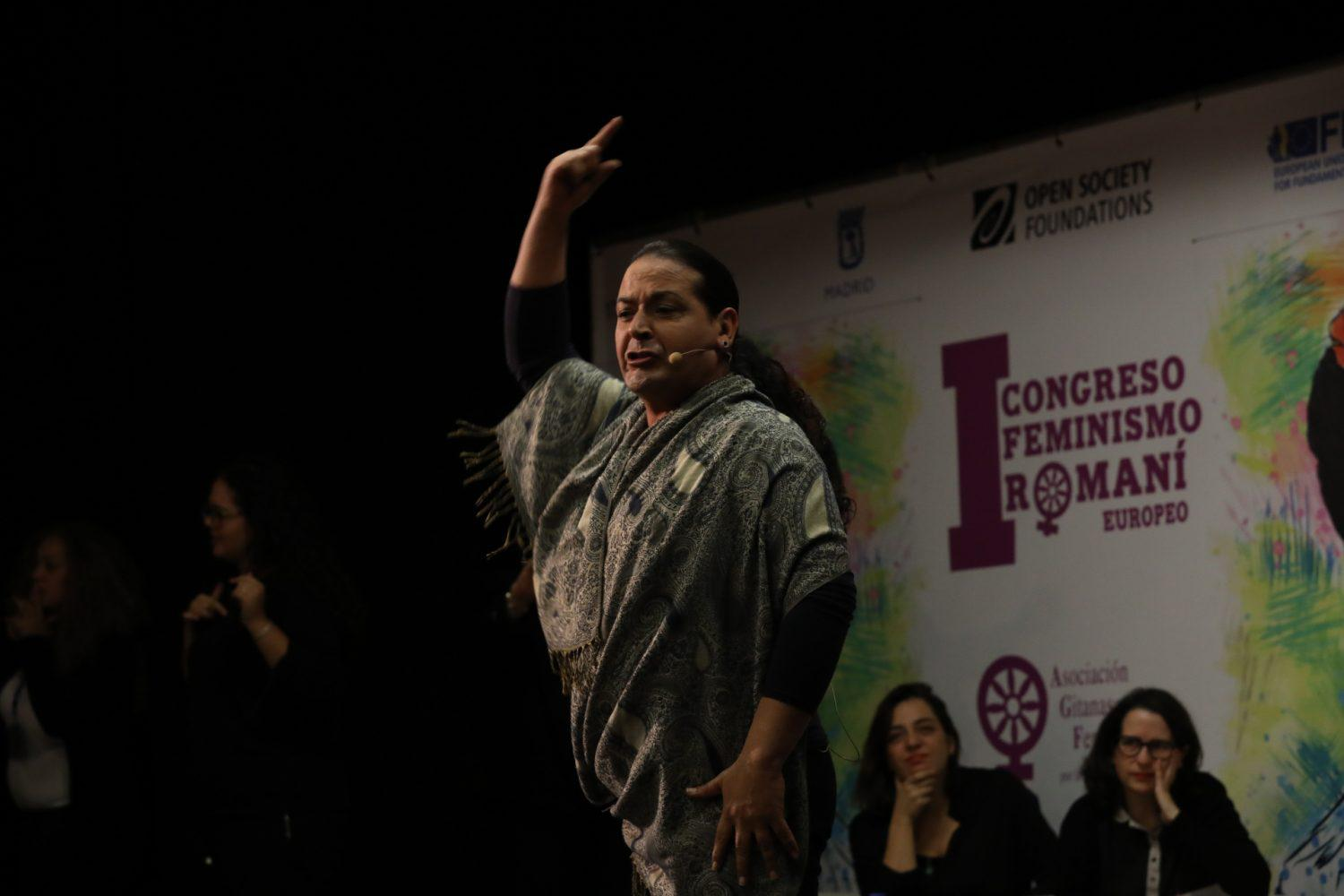
Opening of the First Congress of Romani Feminism in 2017

The Gitanas movement of Spanish Romani women emerged in 1990, the same year the first Romani feminist women's association in Europe was formed, the Asociación de Mujeres Gitanas Romí in Granada. Romí organized the first seminar on the situation of Gitana women in Spain in June 1990. Since then, hundreds of organizations and collectives have been created throughout the country. The movement in part inspired feminist Romani activism in Central and Eastern Europe.

== Theory ==
Emilia Aiello-Cabrera et al. suggest three key elements of Romani feminism: "the role of men as allies, claiming freedom as women as a central aspect of Roma cultural identity, and advocating for a feminism that promotes and safeguards the idea of equality of differences." According to Roma activist and anthropologist Anna Mirga-Kruszelnicka, "the uniqueness of ‘Gitano feminism’ lies in its openness to men: it is framed as a joint struggle for the improvement and development of the Romani communities."

The concept of intersectionality is key to Romani feminist discourse. Romani professor Alexandra Oprea says that "[f]eminist and antiracist politics in Europe are still by and large two separate struggles, and Romani feminists wind up in a separate, isolated sphere fighting on their own." In addition to gender and ethnicity, class is frequently brought up in discussions of Romani women's oppression, as they are more likely to be in conditions of poverty. These issues are exacerbated by gender; Romani women have worse outcomes in employment, health, and education compared to Romani men. The Romani feminist movement has also been described in terms of positionality.

Romani feminism incorporates critiques by Black and Third World feminists of concepts such as "universal sisterhood". Many Romani feminists assert white feminists often negate the autonomy of Romani women by acting as if they are saving them from a "barbaric" or "backward" culture.

Romani feminism is also related to the movement of decolonization. Laura Corradi describes Romani women as inhabiting an "invisible continent", simultaneously inside and on the margins of Euro-Atlantic society.

== Goals and challenges ==
Among the aspects most defended by this group are access to housing, education and the visibility of women, although there are many others, such as the normalization of sexual diversity. At the Roma Women's Forum in 2003, female Roma activists made a number of proposals, including the desegregation of education, provision of employment and economic opportunities to Roma women and youth, and ending coercive government sterilization programs. The specific issues dealt with by Romani women also vary by location and social setting.

One of the biggest challenges for the Roma community is to maintain Roma tradition and identity while respecting the decisions and freedom of women.

=== Poverty, employment and education ===
According to a survey of 11 EU member states by the European Union Agency for Fundamental Rights (FRA) conducted from 2008 to 2012, 42% of Roma live in "severe housing deprivation" and 87% of Roma households earn an amount below the national at-risk-of-poverty line (compared to 12% and 46% of non-Roma respectively). The survey also showed that fewer Romani women than men could read or write (77% versus 85%), had been to school (81% vs 86%), or were employed (21% vs 35%). A World Bank report found 59 percent of Roma women in Romania identified as unpaid family workers. This causes Roma women to be financially dependent on men. However, persistent poverty and unemployment among men has led to a decrease in their relative authority within households, which in turn has exacerbated issues of domestic abuse.

=== Forced sterilization ===
Starting in the 1960s or 1970s and continuing into the early 21st century, tens of thousands of Romani women in Czechoslovakia were coerced or forced to undergo state-sanctioned sterilization.This was done primarily by social workers providing financial incentives to undergo sterilization and by health care providers conducting sterilization procedures during other medical care without the knowledge of the patient. The practice primarily ended in 2004 following public pressure and lawsuits. In July 2021, the Czech Senate voted to compensate thousands of Romani women unlawfully sterilized between 1996 and 2012.

=== Stereotypes and misrepresentation ===
Romani women are frequently underrepresented or misrepresented in media and culture. According to Judith Okely, "Gypsy women especially have been the objects of the dominant society's exotic and erotic projections and disorders." Romani scholar Ethel Brooks says "Romani women have been painted as sexually available objects of fantasy and as old witches. We have been portrayed as passive victims of patriarchy who need saving and as thieves and beggars getting rich off of the welfare state."

=== Treatment within Roma communities ===
The treatment or oppression of women within Roma society is debated among Romani activists. Oprea suggests that during times of racial oppression, Romani women are encouraged to defend harmful practices in order to avoid legitimizing racist anti-Roma attitudes. Furthermore, some Romani activists perceive the Romani women's movement as fracturing, diluting, or betraying the goals of the Romani rights movement. Many Roma women are expected to choose between their personal autonomy and maintaining community or family ties. Despite recent advancements, many Roma organizations are still primarily led by men.

Domestic violence against women in Romani society is viewed by some as a Romani feminist issue. A 2011 survey in Bosnia and Herzegovina found over 43% of Roma women have suffered from physical violence from their spouse or partner, with 36% saying they endured psychological abuse. From a study in Croatia, 35% of Roma women had experienced physical violence, 21% psychological violence, 18% economic violence, and almost 9% sexual violence or rape.

==== Gender roles ====
As a whole, Roma preserve a traditional family model in which women serve as mothers and housekeepers. Romani women are expected to take the burden of child-care, in addition to (in some circumstances) working a job. Some consider family roles as a "guarantor of cultural memory and resistance to marginalisation".

==== Expectations of virginity and child marriage ====
According to a World Bank Group report: "The virginity of women prior to marriage is a defining feature of women in all the Roma communities. Public discussions relating to virginity typically cause a lot of friction between traditional and non-traditional Roma girls, reflecting the changing views on the gender values of virginity and womanhood... traditional Roma communities... [remove] girls from schooling before or by the eighth grade to protect her virginity and prepare her for marriage."

Arranged marriages of Romani girls are still practiced in some Roma communities. The practice arose in part because of Romani slavery in Moldavia and Wallachia, where child marriages were a way of protecting Romani girls from rape by their owners. A 2019 report by the BIBIJA Roma Women Center said in Montenegro and Serbia, 18% and 17% of Roma girls are married before age 15; over 55% are married before 18. The previously cited FRA report found 2% of Romani girls aged 10–15 were 'traditionally married' or living with a partner, with 16% of Roma boys and girls aged 16–17 years doing so.

=== LGBTQ+ rights ===
According to Dezső Máté, Romani feminists and LGBTQ+ activists have been historically connected by their shared goals of personal freedom and collective emancipation, and their invisibility within mainstream discourse prior to the 2000s. Many Roma queer activists and feminists still fight against marginalization and exclusion within non-Roma groups.

== See also ==
- Antiziganism
- Aporophobia
- Black feminism
- Chicana feminism
- Classism
- Coloniality of gender
- Ethnocentrism
- Feminationalism
- Global feminism
- Postcolonial feminism
- Indigenous feminism
- Intersectionality
- Islamic feminism
- Postfeminism
- Purplewashing
- Sámi feminism
- Transnational feminism
- Womanism
