= Kim Anderson (professor) =

Canadian academic

- Born: Ottawa, Ontario, Canada
- Education: University of Toronto (BA); Ontario Institute for Studies in Education (MA); University of Guelph (PhD)
- Employer: University of Guelph

Kim Anderson is a Canadian academic.

She was born and raised in Ottawa, Ontario. Her paternal grandmother, Catherine Anne Sanderson (b.1902) was the granddaughter of the Métis voyageur, Thomas Sanderson. Anderson has worked in educational tourism, community-based education, and cross-cultural education. When she became a mother in 1995, she began to research and write about motherhood and culture-based understandings of Indigenous womanhood.

Anderson is a professor at the University of Guelph, and is affiliated with the Department of Family Relations and Applied Nutrition in the College of Social and Applied Human Sciences. Anderson is Métis and her research focused on Indigenous mothering, Indigenous feminism, Indigenous masculinities, and Indigenous knowledge in urban settings. She holds the Canada Research Chair in Indigenous Relationality and Storied Practice.

She received her PhD in history from the University of Guelph in 2010, where her doctoral work focused on the role of Anishinaabek life stage teachings among northern Algonquin women as a site for Indigenous peoples to decolonise and construct healthier futures. Her M.A. is in Adult Education and Sociology and Equity Studies from University of Toronto's Ontario Institute for Studies in Education, and she previously earned a B.A. as an English Specialist also from the University of Toronto.

Anderson has also worked as a consultant for Indigenous organizations and communities for twenty years.

== Career ==
Anderson joined the Department of Family Relations and Applied Nutrition at the University of Guelph in 2017 and earned a Canada Research Chair in Indigenous Relationships in 2018 that ran through 2023 and then was renewed as a chair in Indigenous Relationality and Storied Practice. She has worked to indigenize the campus through a range of programs including language training, food and medicine gardens on campus, and ceremonial spaces.

Anderson has authored and edited multiple books, including:

- A Recognition of Being: Reconstructing Native Womanhood (Canadian Scholars, 2001)
- Life Stages and Native Women: Memory, Teachings and Story Medicine (University of Manitoba Press, 2011). ISBN 9780887557262
- Indigenous Men and Masculinities: Legacies, Identities, Regeneration (edited with Robert Alexander Innes; University of Manitoba Press, 2015)
- Mothers of the Nations: Indigenous Mothering as Global Resistance, Reclaiming and Recovery (edited with Dawn Memee Lavell-Harvard; Demeter Press, 2014)
- Injichaag: My Soul in Story: Anishinaabe Poetics in Art and Words (with Rene Meshake; University of Manitoba Press, 2019). ISBN 9780887558993
- Strong Women Stories: Native Vision and Community Survival (edited with Bonita Lawrence; Toronto: Sumach Press, 2003). ISBN 978-1-894549-21-9

Prior to joining the faculty at University of Guelph, Anderson served as associate professor in Indigenous Studies at Wilfrid Laurier University from 2011 to 2016. In much of her work, Anderson has engaged in collaborative community research and programming, such as the "Biidwewidam Indigenous Masculinities" project that received a Social Sciences and Humanities Research Council Partnership Development Grant in 2014 and involved the Ontario Federation of Indian Friendship Centres (OFIFC) and the Native Youth Sexual Health Network (NYSHN) to build "research capacity around Indigenous masculinities and identities with the intent of contributing to the health and wellness of Indigenous communities and peoples."

== Activism and formation of Kika'ige Historical Society ==
Anderson co-founded the Kika'ige Historical Society, a professional performance art group dedicated to upsetting settler narratives while privileging Indigenous ways of knowing and history. The Kik'aige Historical Society was formed when Anderson and Lianne Leddy protested the installation of a statue of John A. Macdonald at Wilfrid Laurier University in 2015. The two dressed in prisoner's uniforms and sat beneath the statue for several days. The Kika'ige Historical Society has also contested Canadian Confederation's silencing of Indigenous histories with the "Grannies of Confederation" painting.
