= Bonita Lawrence =

- Occupation: Professor

Academic background
- Education: University of Toronto (BSc); York University (MES); Ontario Institute for Studies in Education (PhD)

Academic work
- Discipline: Equity studies
- Sub-discipline: Indigenous studies
- Main interests: Race and racism; Aboriginal people and the criminal justice system; federally unrecognized native communities; urban, non-status, and Métis identities

Bonita Lawrence is a Canadian writer, scholar, and professor emeritus in the Department of Humanities at York University in Toronto, Canada. Her work focuses on issues related to Indigenous identity and governance, equity, and racism in Canada. She is also a traditional singer at political rallies, social events, and prisons in the Toronto and Kingston areas.

== Early life ==
Bonita Lawrence is self-identified Mi'kmaw, with Acadian and English heritage as well. She was raised in Montreal. She and her five siblings were raised by their mother. Their father, a working-class expatriate from the United Kingdom, was estranged. Lawrence claims her mother was Mi'kmaw but denied her Indigenous identity in an effort to keep social workers away after her husband left. As a result, Lawrence grew up under the guise of being white.

== Education ==
Lawrence obtained a Bachelor of Science in geology from the University of Toronto (1990), a Masters of Environmental Studies from York University (1994), and a PhD in sociology at the Ontario Institute for Studies in Education at the University of Toronto (1999).

== Career ==
After completing her doctorate, Lawrence worked as an assistant professor at Queen's University from 1999 to 2004, teaching for the Institute of Women's Studies.

Since starting as faculty member at York University, Lawrence has influenced the academic programs and campus life there. She created the Indigenous Studies Program in February 2018. Lawrence's research and publications focus primarily on urban, non-status and Métis identities; federally unrecognized Aboriginal communities; and Indigenous justice.

Her work on racism, equity, and decolonization has become an important resource for those working in the area. "Decolonizing Antiracism," an article co-written with Enakshi Dua, has been referenced often online as a fundamental social justice text. Her 2012 book: Fractured Homeland: Federal Recognition and Algonquin Identity in Ontario was shortlisted for the 2013 Canada Prize in the Social Sciences by the Canadian Federation for the Humanities and Social Sciences.

Lawrence also wrote N'In D'la Owey Innklan: Mi'kmaq Sojourns in England, a histortical novel that spans 500 years of Mi'kmaq history in both Atlantic Canada and London, England.

She has also been a member of Community Council, a diversion program for Aboriginal offenders (2007- 2010); Aboriginal Legal Services of Toronto (1998–2005); the board of directors of Anduhyaun (2000–2001); and the board of directors of Katorokwi Native Friendship Centre in Kingston, Ontario (1998–2004).

== Publications ==
- Lawrence, Bonita (1996). The exclusion of survivors' voices in feminist discourse on violence against women. Ottawa: CRIAW/ICREF. ISBN 978-0919653719. OCLC 37983897.
- Lawrence, Bonita (1996). Colonialism, identity and development: a case study from northern Ontario. Faculty of Environmental Studies, York University. OCLC 48443417.
- Lawrence, Bonita (2003-05-01). "Gender, Race, and the Regulation of Native Identity in Canada and the United States: An Overview". Hypatia. 18 (2): 3–31. doi:10.1111/j.1527-2001.2003.tb00799.x. ISSN 1527-2001.
- Anderson, Bonita; Anderson, Kim, eds. (2003), Strong Women Stories: Native Vision and Community Survival, Sumach Press, ISBN 978-1894549219, OCLC 1012129768
- Lawrence, Bonita; Dua, Enakshi (2005). "Decolonizing Anti-Racism". Race, Racism, and Empire: Reflections on Canada. 32 (4): 120–143.
- Lawrence, Bonita (2009). "Reclaiming Ktaqumkuk: Land and Mi'kmaq Identity in Newfoundland". In Agyeman, Julian; Cole, Peter; Haluza-DeLay, Randolph; O'Riley, Pat (eds.). Speaking for Ourselves: Environmental Justice in Canada. UBC Press. pp. 42–64. ISBN 978-0774816199.
- Lawrence, Bonita; Amadahy, Zainab (2009). "Indigenous Peoples and Black People in Canada: Settlers or Allies?". In Kempf, Arlo (ed.). Breaching the Colonial Contract: Anti-Colonialism in the US and Canada. Springer. ISBN 978-90-481-3888-3.
- Lawrence, Bonita (2011). "Indigenous and Restorative Justice: Reclaiming Humanity and Community". In Charlton, John; Verrecchia, Philip; Pavelka, Sandra (eds.). International Perspectives on Restorative Justice in Education. JCharlton Pub. pp. 89–112. ISBN 9780981151861.
- Lawrence, Bonita (2012). Fractured Homeland: Federal Recognition and Algonquin Identity in Ontario. UBC Press. ISBN 9780774822893. OCLC 957463520.
- Lawrence, Bonita (2014). "Real" Indians and Others: Mixed-Blood Urban Native Peoples and Indigenous Nationhood. Lincoln: University of Nebraska Press. ISBN 9780803204195.
- Lawrence, Bonita (2020). N'In D'la Owey Innklan: Mi'kmaq Sojourns in England. Austin Macauley Publishers Limited. ISBN 978-1788783651.
