= Indigenous food security in Canada =

For many Indigenous communities in Canada, food insecurity is a major, ongoing problem. A variety of factors, including poverty, the COVID-19 pandemic, government inaction and climate change, exacerbated by both historical and ongoing discrimination faced by Indigenous Canadians, have played a role in the creation of this crisis.

== Socioeconomic factors and prevalence ==
Indigenous peoples are at a higher risk than non-Indigenous peoples to experience food insecurity. Food insecurity is directly linked to being in a low-income household, and Indigenous people on average experience higher amounts of income inequality than non-Indigenous peoples. A November 2019 report found that 48% of First Nations households were food insecure, with provinces such as Alberta having numbers as high 60%. First Nations children, in particular, experience major food insecurity.

== Accessibility and availability ==
In one community (according to one 2002 study), it was the consensus that the price of market foods in a northern community were very high, and that there needed to be government-implemented policies that would help lower the cost of food in more remote locations. In the 2020s, food insecurity still remains a major issue for Inuk people, as it has been noted that food prices are still unsustainably high, despite attempts by Canadian government agencies to lower them. In 2022, Manitoban First Nations also expressed concerns about dealing with rising food prices.

Other barriers for obtaining a steady diet of traditional food include hunting equipment costs, transportation, and a lack of knowledgeable hunters and fishers are just some of the reasons consumption of traditional food has proven to be difficult. The use of land using non-traditional techniques, such as those found in mining and logging, affect the availability of appropriate food sources. The main concern of the community was the loss of knowledge of traditional food practices between generations. Younger members of the community are not being taught to hunt, fish, gather or prepare the traditional foods that their ancestors ate and that are integral to a strong and healthy community. Increased development also leads to changing animal migration patterns as well as decrease in animal population and this again will influence the amount of land-based food that can be obtained through traditional ways. The location of an Indigenous community has a large impact on the prevalence of food insecurity in that particular place. Northern communities are at a greater disadvantage than Indigenous communities that are located close to urban centers. The price of market food is higher in more remote communities because of transportation costs. Certain Inuit communities are even more disadvantaged than others because climatic changes that affect hunting and fishing have only been recorded in certain communities.

Due to dwindling populations and changing economic factors, Gwich’in and Inuvialuit communities in the Northwest Territories have shifted away from commercial muskrat trapping, turning it into an infrequent activity. This decline, coupled with limited sustainable income, has reduced consumption of this traditional food and weakened ties to local, sustainable diets [49]. Malli A, Monteith H, Hiscock EC, Smith EV, Fairman K, Galloway T, Mashford-Pringle A. Impacts of colonization on Indigenous food systems in Canada and the United States: a scoping review. BMC Public Health. 2023 Oct 26;23(1):2105. doi: 10.1186/s12889-023-16997-7. PMID: 37885000; PMCID: PMC10601184.

== Health concerns ==
In Nunavut the average life span is approximately 12 years lower than the average Canadian. This is for a number of reasons such as access to healthcare, lower average of socioeconomic standing, poor quality of housing, and the quality of basic services such as drinking water and affordable food. The studies done in this area are very limited but there has been some information collected. The project Climate Change and Health in Nunavik and Labrador looked at the impacts on health in these communities due to changing climates and access to land-based food sources such as fish, geese and seals. There is concern for the senior citizens in these communities because they cannot go and hunt for themselves but still rely on land-based sources of food. Food security for urban Indigenous people is also important to look at. Not having proper access to food can lead to a number of health issues such as low birth weights, developmental delays, depression, anxiety and suicide. These issues are already pressing in Indigenous communities and a lot could be done to help with more equal access to food. High rates of diabetes are a large indicator of the food that Indigenous people are ingesting. There has been a change in diet from traditional foods to European foods and medicine. The members of this northern Ontario Indigenous community stated their preference for wild meat and berries because they believe it is healthier than store-bought foods. The cost of food is also high unless the person is purchasing processed "junk foods". These types of foods can lead to a decline in physical health and this is not the preferred diet of a traditional Indigenous person. There are certain essential nutrients that are especially of concern in Indigenous diets: protein, zinc, vitamin D, iron, omega 3 fatty acids, and selenium. These influence a person's physical health as well as their mental and emotional health. The caribou and other traditional foods are excellent sources of these nutrients.

== Impact of climate change ==
The loss of ice roads is detrimental to hunting patterns of Inuit communities.

Climate change is a serious concern for Indigenous Canadians. This region has already felt the impacts of the change of environment on their food supply. There are very distinctive Indigenous cultural groups in the north including the Yukon First Nation, Dene, Metis, Gwich’in, and Inuit. Approximately 70% of Indigenous adults in the North hunt and fish as a means of sustenance and 96% of those adults rely on the food they receive from natural resources. Climate change has been found to have an impacts on the movement of animals and the hunting conditions. Sea ice travel is a main component of hunting for Inuit. They must travel across ice roads to gain access to wildlife resources. If the ice is not as strong or does not reach as far than this results in less hunting time and a lesser chance of bringing home a substantial amount of food. The implications of less hunting time have a severe effect on the nutritional value of the Inuit diet. The decreased ice road time also hinders the delivery of market foods and increases the price of these staples when other modes of transportation (such as flying) have to be employed. Other weather conditions such as increased winds, higher rainfall records, decreased snowfall, lack of extreme cold temperatures, increased coastal erosion, decreased animal population growth and lower fresh water levels all contribute to food insecurity in certain northern Inuit communities. Establishing a community based food supply is a viable option for northern and remote Indigenous communities because it ensures that everyone is meeting the nutritional needs that are essential for survival. These communities need to adapt to the changing environment or their food security will decline substantially.

== Impact of the COVID-19 pandemic ==
The COVID-19 pandemic, which already hit the Indigenous communities particularly hard, has also had a negative impact on their food security. Food prices increased as the Canadian economy entered a recession due to the pandemic, but even as the rest of the economy began to recover in 2021, food prices were still projected to go up.

== Food security in Arctic regions including Inuit Nunangat ==
There has been a particular focus on food security issues in Arctic regions of North America, including Alaska. In 2021, Kristen M. Green and colleagues published a study proving environmental issues occurring in other Arctic regions in Alaska, saying the side effects “mediate access to subsistence resources”, ultimately leading to economic problems and severe food insecurity. The animals that Alaskan Indigenous communities hunt have been a part of their traditions for hundreds of years and have become vital for their diet. For example, in Shishmaref, the seal is a very commonly hunted animal, mainly for preparing seal oil, characterized as "the epicenter of subsistence" because it is a staple ingredient for so many traditions.
