= Indigenous feminism =

Political, social, and cultural movement and theory

Indigenous feminism is an intersectional theory and practice of feminism that focuses on decolonization, Indigenous sovereignty, and human rights for Indigenous women and their families. The focus is to empower Indigenous women in the context of Indigenous cultural values and priorities, rather than mainstream, white, patriarchal ones. In this cultural perspective, it can be compared to womanism in the African-American communities.

Indigenous communities are diverse. While some women continue to hold considerable power within their tribal nations and traditional societies, many others have lost their leadership roles within their communities; others may live outside of traditional communities altogether. Women who hold power in their communities, or in the world at large, may also have differing goals from those who are still struggling for basic human rights.

Modern Indigenous feminism has developed as a communal worldview that prioritizes the issues faced by Indigenous women. Surviving generations of ongoing genocide, colonisation, and racism have resulted in priorities for Indigenous women that may differ from those of mainstream feminism. Mainstream feminists have often been unwilling to prioritize issues which are urgent crises in Indigenous communities. For example, the Missing and Murdered Indigenous Women (MMIW) crisis, forced sterilization of Indigenous women, the struggle for land rights, and the disproportionate sexual victimization of Native American women by white men.

Indigenous feminism is related to postcolonial feminism as it acknowledges the devastating consequences of colonisation on Indigenous peoples and the lands they inhabit, along with the importance of decolonisation in dismantling oppressive systems that were introduced with colonisation. The central role of the ancestral landbase, and current land rights and environmental struggles, connect Indigenous feminism to some aspects of ecofeminism and Indigenous philosophies of environmental care. Indigenous approaches to environmental care emphasize the interdependency between humans, non-human beings, and the land itself. While these concepts of care may not be fully captured by English terminology, there is a clear focus on the reciprocal responsibility between individuals and the environment—an interconnected framework that histories of colonialism have long sought to erase. Within this framework, failures to care for the environment are seen as akin to neglecting or failing to care for other people. This spiritual extension of care to the land diverges from ecofeminism, which identifies anthropocentrism and androcentrism as the primary root causes of environmental harms. Differentiating Indigenous feminism from mainstream white feminism and its related forms of feminism (including liberal feminism and Orientalist feminism) is important because "Indigenous women will have different concrete experiences that shape our relations to core themes" than those of non-Indigenous women.

Indigenous feminism is also known by other, geographically specific, names such as: Native American feminism in the United States, First Nations feminism in Canada, Aboriginal or Indigenous Australian feminism in Australia. Despite the use of the more globally-applicable word "Indigenous", the majority of text that refers to "Indigenous feminism" tends to focus on North American Indigenous populations - Native Americans in the United States and Indigenous Peoples in Canada (First Nations, Inuit and Métis - a.k.a. FNIM).

== Effects of colonization ==
In most Indigenous communities, colonization, including the colonial weaponization of Christianity, has brought about the most profound and harmful changes in the standing and treatment of women.

=== Colonial Regulation of Indigenous Women’s Bodies ===
Indigenous feminist scholarship shows that settler colonialism is maintained not only through land appropriation but also through the gendered and sexual regulation of Indigenous peoples. Researchers note that colonial authorities reshaped Indigenous kinship, sexuality, and gender expression to impose Euro-Canadian heteropatriarchal norms and weaken the political influence of Indigenous women. Missionaries and Indian agents enforced standards of monogamy, modesty, and domesticity, often punishing non-compliance through child apprehension, economic control, or criminal sanctions. Early versions of the Indian Act reinforced these hierarchies by restricting Indigenous women’s political roles and revoking their legal status if they married non-Status men.

Indigenous feminists also highlight how beauty standards functioned as colonial tools. Eurocentric ideals associated thinness, restraint, and modest femininity with moral value, while casting Indigenous women’s bodies as excessive or immoral. These ideas circulated through 19th-century literature and artwork, including stereotypes such as the “Indian Princess” and the “Squaw.” Scholars argue that such tropes justified surveillance of Indigenous women’s sexuality and contributed to broader projects of dispossession.

Contemporary analyses link these histories to modern biopolitics. Public health discourses framing Indigenous fatness as an “obesity epidemic” reproduce colonial assumptions that locate social problems within Indigenous women’s bodies rather than within structural issues such as land loss, environmental change, and food insecurity. These narratives reinforce racialized expectations around discipline, self-control, and normative femininity.

Indigenous feminists note that similar forms of gendered and bodily regulation appear across multiple settler states, including Canada, the United States, and Australia. These studies show that the policing of appearance, intimacy, and bodily sovereignty functions as a key mechanism through which settler colonial states assert authority while undermining Indigenous self-determination.

=== Gender relations within Indigenous communities ===
Through colonisation, Indigenous people became subject to a racist patriarchal system that significantly shifted the social, economic, and cultural practices of pre-contact Indigenous societies. The economic, political, and spiritual power granted to women in Indigenous communities was threatening to the arriving Europeans who used "Xenophobia and a deep fear of Native spiritual practices" to justify genocide as a means of domination. Additionally, "while women's traditional roles in Indigenous communities vary widely, colonization has reordered gender relations to subordinate women, regardless of their pre-contact status."

=== Political and economic status of Indigenous women ===
The struggles faced by Indigenous people today are due to the actions taken by settlers to assert dominance through colonization. White settlers often brought a new type of economic system from their European nation that included the idea of private property, ownership, and gendered labor, which was forced onto Indigenous communities. In A Recognition of Being: Reconstructing Native Womanhood, Anderson notes, "the split between public and private labour and the introduction of the capitalist economies disrupted the traditional economic authorities of Native women." In order to strip women of political power, colonizers forced regulatory systems onto Indigenous people, the Indian Act of Canada is one example of this. This act defined women's status as inferior to men's. Indigenous identity and status were now determined based on a patrilineal blood line, which cost women much of their social and political power. The political and spiritual power of women are often connected, as the spiritual or theoretical role for women can inform a real political role. As a result, "heteropatriarchal religious traditions have excluded women and two-spirited peoples from leadership roles."

=== Indigenous women and the medical industrial complex ===
Colonizers also worked to restructure Indigenous social systems to fit within the white settler ideal by labeling any transgressors, such as women, as “criminally insane” for “breaching racial and social conventions.” Through institutionalization of Indigenous women in psychiatric hospitals and penal systems, colonizers were able to surveil and control the reproduction of Indigenous women. Chunn and Menzies (1998) found that a disproportionate number of women who were labeled criminally insane and incarcerated were from ethnic and racial minority groups; significantly, of the 38 women incarcerated for reasons of criminal insanity, seven were First Nations women.

Canada is known for treatment of its Indigenous women in the aforementioned manner. For example, Canadian eugenics boards used these justifications of mental illness to pass Sexual Sterilization Acts in Alberta and British Columbia from the 1930s to 1970s. These boards could forcefully sterilize institutionalized patients who “if discharged without being subjected to an operation for sexual sterilization would be likely to beget or bear children who by reason of inheritance would have a tendency to serious mental disease or mental deficiency.” 74% of all Aboriginal patients presented to eugenics boards were eventually sterilized, compared to 60% across all patients. Karen Stote, author of An Act of Genocide: Colonialism and the Sterilization of Aboriginal Women, estimates the number of sterilizations occurring between 1966 and 1976 to be more than 1200, 1150 of which were Indigenous women.

In 1916 in the United States, the Office of Indian Affairs (OIA) launched the Save the Babies initiative. This campaign, which was a part of a broader effort during the Progressive Era to improve mother and baby health in the United States, advocated for hospital delivery as a way to reduce the high rates of infant death among Native Americans. Hospital births were viewed by the OIA as a means of changing Native family structures, birthing customs, and perceptions of Western treatment. The campaign also created a booklet, Indian Babies: How to Keep Them Well, that instructed indigenous mothers on Western approaches to feeding, cleaning, and caring for infants. In order to eradicate Native health practices and weaken the power of elders and extended family networks, the program was a component of a broader assimilationist strategy. Theobald contends that the effort is a pillar of federal Indian policy in the early 20th century, notwithstanding its inconsistent execution and frequent lack of funding.The OIA's mission was to manage Native reproduction and further assimilationist objectives by making hospital births the standard for Native women.

== Theory and scholarship ==
Indigenous feminism seeks to build on traditional models while also incorporating modern, intersectional feminist ideas. Indigenous feminism diverges from postcolonial feminism, as some have argued that postcolonial theory in general has largely ignored the histories of colonialism as it exists for Indigenous populations. Some other Indigenous scholars (such as Robert Warrior, Elizabeth Cook-Lynn, Craig S. Womack) have expressed concern over the limits of postcolonial theory and its application to Indigenous studies. There is often distrust of Western theoretical paradigms which can marginalize Indigenous perspectives. In "Who Stole Native American Studies?" Elizabeth Cook-Lynn discusses the significant debate about what constitutes post-colonial, and who gets the privilege of naming when a society becomes post-colonial. As a result, many have moved to Indigenous feminism as a way to redress these issues with postcolonial feminism.

The development of modern Indigenous feminism came out of a counterinsurgency against the attempt to apply Western feminism equally and effectively to all women regardless of their experiences. Such attempts are seen as fruitless because it homogenized the very diverse experiences of women and Indigenous people. Building off of the theory of intersectionality from Kimberlé Crenshaw, Indigenous feminist theory seeks to reverse the ways that White feminism "conflates or ignores intragroup differences."

Cheryl Suzack and Shari M. Huhndorf argue in Indigenous Women and Feminism: Politics, Activism and Culture that: "Although Indigenous feminism is a nascent field of scholarly inquiry, it has arisen from histories of women's activism and culture that have aimed to combat gender discrimination, secure social justice for Indigenous women, and counter their social erasure and marginalization – endeavors that fall arguably under the rubric of feminism, despite Indigenous women's fraught relationship with the term and with mainstream feminist movements." The urgent issues to address Indigenous feminism cross the boundary between what is considered feminist and what is considered indigenous.

Much of Indigenous feminism has taken shape around issues that resulted from colonial practices. Indigenous feminism is a direct result of, and a direct answer to the colonization and continued oppression of Indigenous peoples around the world. The need to question cultural practices from within allows Indigenous women to actively shape their own communities and helps encourage self-determination and cultural ownership. Differentiating Indigenous feminism from white feminism illuminates the ways that white feminism does not fully account for Indigenous experiences.

Similarly, Indigenous feminism is set apart from other Indigenous rights movements, such as Indigenous liberation theory, because those theories have "not been attentive to the gendered ways in which colonial oppression and racism function for men and women, or to the inherent and adopted sexisms that some communities manifest." There are some within Indigenous communities who choose not to identify as feminist and therefore distance themselves from the mainstream feminism. There are many reasons for this choice, however, Kim Anderson argues that if:

Western feminism is unpalatable because it is about rights rather than responsibilities, then we should all take responsibility seriously and ask if we are being responsible to all members of our societies. If we are to reject equality in favour of difference, then we need to make sure those differences are embedded in systems that empower all members. If we see feminism as being too invested in Western liberalism and individual autonomy, then we need to ensure that our collectivist approaches serve everyone in the collective. And if we want to embrace essential elements of womanhood that have been problematic for Western feminists ... then we have to ensure that these concepts don't get stuck in literal or patriarchal interpretations.

Many scholars and activists identify Indigenous feminism as relating to radical feminism since it often advocates for an upheaval of all systems of power that organize the subjugation of Indigenous women based on both male supremacy and racial difference. Indigenous feminism encourages participation in decolonization needed from both men and women. Myrna Cunningham (Miskita) has stated that: "The struggle of Indigenous Peoples is not a threat to our struggles as Indigenous women. On the contrary, we see these struggles as reciprocal." Decolonization is seen as the ultimate tool to combat subordination of Indigenous people.

== Critique of white feminism ==
Indigenous feminists are often reluctant to engage with western mainstream feminist theory due to its failure to recognize the effects of the gendered process of colonialism on indigenous women, as well as due to a historical pattern of white women not understanding, or not being willing to be allies against, the multiple oppressions faced by Indigenous women. Mainstream feminists usually assume that fighting oppression on the basis of sex or gender is the top (or even sole) priority, while seeing indigeneity as of secondary importance. Moreton-Robinson has written that white feminists "are extraordinarily reluctant to see themselves in the situation of being oppressors, as they feel that this will be at the expense of concentrating upon being oppressed". Furthermore, Andrea Smith has written that Indigenous feminists "are challenging how we conceptualize Indigenous sovereignty -- it is not an add-on to the heteronormative and patriarchal nation-state. Rather it challenges the nation-state itself." All Indigenous women share the common experience of oppression resulting from colonialism; this is an oppression which they share with all other Indigenous peoples.

The perspective of Indigenous women is therefore shaped by their historical connection to their landbase and by a legacy of dispossession, racism, and sexism. Indigenous feminists continue their activism within at times matriarchal contexts, as well as negotiating sexual politics across and within non-white cultures. White middle-class feminist women's relative privilege is tied to an often-unquestioned and unacknowledged legacy of benefiting from colonialism and to the dispossession of Indigenous people. For Indigenous women, all white feminists have benefited from colonization, and continue to reap benefits accordingly; white women are overwhelmingly and disproportionately represented, have key roles, and constitute the normal standard of womanhood within Australia and other colonial countries. According to Darlene Juschka, the problem in addressing Indigenous feminist issues through this lens is that white mainstream feminism was itself infused with a narrative of colonialism. It has used indigeneity, racism, heteronormativity, and Christianity as tools to "other" Indigenous people and to justify a need to "civilize" them; as a result, there has been a lack of inclusion of Indigenous women's work in mainstream discourses.

Typically, when white feminists have 'advocated' or 'included' Indigenous women in their activism, it has been in a tokenistic sense, advocating primarily for their own benefit, and not for the collective benefit of all women, inclusive of the needs of Indigenous Australian women. It has been evident in many Indigenous feminist movements that "Aboriginal (and other forms of Indigenous feminism) feminism is a theoretical engagement with history and politics, as well as a practical engagement with contemporary social, economic, cultural and political issues". While Indigenous women may acknowledge that there is overlap in the goals of Indigenous feminists and of mainstream feminists, many, like Celeste Liddle (Arrernte) "strongly believe that as Aboriginal women, whilst our fights are related to ongoing feminist struggles within other racially marginalized groups, they are not the same". Minnie Grey in her essay From the Tundra to the Boardroom and Everywhere in Between about mainstream feminism discusses how it often fails to look beyond the basics of female oppression based on sex and gender at other issues, such as class, education, and the effects of these forms of oppression on Indigenous men.

"We, as Inuit women, have been striving for such things as equal pay for equal work, equal share of roles for the good of the family, equal rights to participate in the decision-making processes of our governments, equal rights for the hiring of women at all levels of commerce and science, equal rights in education, and most importantly, equal rights to raise our children in safe, healthy, and positive conditions. This means, among other things, above the poverty line. I look at these aspirations not as women's liberation, but as people's liberation. In fact, we need and love our men, and similarly, we need to liberate them from the concepts that bind them to unbreakable traditional roles that, in turn, keep the status quo intact in many regions of the world."

One example of the need to incorporate uniquely Indigenous perspectives is in second-wave feminist women's struggle for wage parity with their male counterparts. Celeste Liddle states that "for example, whilst equal pay is important for all of us, for many years Aboriginal people were historically not paid for their labour at all". Therefore, the second wave's fight for wage equality (among other issues), was perceived as pushing the rights of Indigenous women to the periphery.

Another example is in the length of time taken to achieve certain rights. For example, while white women deemed to be citizens of Canada won the right to vote in 1918, all other women were not allowed the right to vote until much later. Aboriginal women in Canada were not allowed to vote until the 1960s, at which time the second wave of feminism had moved away from such issues.

Rauna Kuokkanen (Sámi) has argued for a specifically Indigenous paradigm, as opposed to a feminist one because while "some feminist theories and practices also aim at social and political changes in a society...their approaches often exclude notions of collectivity as well as land rights which are central elements for Indigenous peoples."

Cunningham presents another criticism of mainstream feminism:

They see that the dominant feminist paradigm is based on an unacknowledged model of centre and periphery. In this model, Indigenous, African-descendent, and poor women occupy the periphery and must accept the ideas and conceptualization of feminism as defined by those at the centre. In other words, we Indigenous women are expected to accept the dominant picture of what constitutes women's oppression and women's liberation. The trouble is, this picture is only a partial match with our own experiences. Elements of our experience that do not match this picture are denied or marginalized. This dominant model tries to homogenize the women's movement, claiming that all women have the same demands and the same access to the enjoyment of their rights. This flawed assumption denies the diverse cultural, linguistic and social needs and visions of distinct groups of women.

Indigenous feminist scholars have resisted the co-optation and exploitation of their scholarship as another result of colonialism. As a collective, various Indigenous feminist scholars have called for "the profound need for transparency and responsibility in light of the traumatic histories of colonization, slavery, and genocide that shape the present" in order to ensure Indigenous feminism is informed by decolonization.

== Criticism of Indigenous feminism ==
A criticism of Indigenous feminism among some western academics and pop culture writers is that Indigenous populations "choose to distance themselves from feminism". Feminism is viewed as unimportant by some indigenous women because the status of women in some of these societies was higher prior to colonization. That is to say, according to Hall, that to be "indigenous" is inherently "feminist". But this critique itself relies on a definition of feminism (or "white feminism") as "colonial discourses relevant to western women only". Feminism as a whole is often generalized as a white American phenomenon, with multiple scholars and feminists arguing that white feminism insufficiently addresses the concerns of women of more diverse backgrounds. Indigenous Australian feminist Aileen Moreton-Robinson argues that all Indigenous women experience living in a society that casts them aside, which needs to be challenged through the practice of Indigenous feminism. While all feminism is meant to identify interconnected forms of oppression that affect all women, historically, racism along with non-Native ignorance of Native women's continued existence and particular struggles (such as the Missing and Murdered Indigenous Women crisis) has continued to alienate Indigenous women who don't see mainstream feminism as welcoming them or addressing their most crucial concerns.

A majority of the texts that are labeled as "Indigenous feminism" refer solely to the Indigenous populations of Native Americans in the United States and, to a lesser extent, to the First Nations peoples of Canada. This is often the case when "Indigenous feminists" themselves are referred to, such as Leanne Betasamosake Simpson and Leslie Marmon Silko.

There are several forms of feminism that address indigenous populations and may follow similar theories, themes, and/or scholarships of Indigenous feminism, but do not directly identify as "Indigenous feminism". These forms of feminism can include Intersectional feminism, transnational feminism, postcolonial feminism, Native Hawaiian feminism, feminism in India, and Asian feminism. These forms of feminism are often separated from one another, in both scholarship and activism, due to the slight differences in beliefs and focuses. Some have called for more unity among these groups, theories and approaches.

== Activism ==
Resistance and activism against dominant colonial powers can come in a number of forms, including but not limited to: legal or political protest, healing practices, storytelling, or art activism.

=== Missing and murdered Indigenous women (MMIW) ===
The ongoing attempted genocide of Indigenous women is of utmost priority in Indigenous feminism, while in mainstream feminism this femicide is rarely prioritized, unless it is non-indigenous women being murdered.

On October 4, and February 14, Indigenous feminists have for years encouraged the community to participate in vigils and actions for justice for these women and their families. "Sisters In Spirit" are one group organizing the vigils, in honour of the lives of Missing and Murdered Indigenous Women and Girls (MMIWG). These vigils resulted in the Government of Canada launching a National Inquiry into Missing and Murdered Indigenous Women and Girls in September 2016. This inquiry examined and reported on the violence against Indigenous women and girls in Canada by looking at the patterns, underlying factors and ultimately, the systemic cause of the violence. While the progress of the inquiry was slowed and at times stifled by issues such as lack of clarity regarding testimony dates and limited staff and resources, it eventually reached the conclusion that there is an ongoing genocide against Indigenous women in North America.

In the United States, the National Resource Center to Enhance Safety of Native Women and their Children (NIWRC) was created "to enhance the capacity of American Indian and Alaska Native (Native) tribes, Native Hawaiians, and Tribal and Native Hawaiian organizations to respond to domestic violence." This organization also shares in Indigenous feminist themes by their dedication sovereignty and the safety of Indigenous women and children.

On March 14th, 2019, an oversight hearing, later published as “ Oversight Hearing On Unmasking the Hidden Crisis of Murdered and Missing Indigenous Women (MMIW): Exploring Solutions to End the Cycle of Violence" was held by the House of Representatives Subcommittee on Indigenous Peoples of the United States of the Committee on Natural Resources. This oversight hearing was held by Chairman Ruben Gallego, and he invited multiple speakers to address the growing issue of Missing and Murdered Indigenous women.

=== Idle No More ===
Idle No More is an Indigenous movement founded by three Indigenous women and one non-Native ally, with the intent to "shift the contemporary discourses of rights, sovereignty, and nationhood by arguing that it is Indigenous women who ought to hold the political power of Indigenous nations, or at the very least have an equal seat at the debate table." Their major themes of activism include sovereignty, the resurgence of nationhood, environmental protection, and resistance of violence against Indigenous women. This work is being done through making changes to The Indian Act of Canada, a piece of legislation that restricts Indigenous sovereignty, as well as advocating for environmental protection. Their activism asks people, regardless of Indigenous descent or not, to honor Indigenous sovereignty and to protect the environment. Another Canadian organization that focuses and promotes Indigenous feminist ideals is the Native Women's Association of Canada (NWAC). They work to empower women by developing and changing legislation which affects Indigenous people.

=== Indigenous Peoples' Day ===
Working to change the name of "Christopher Columbus Day" to "Indigenous Peoples' Day" is an example of changing the narrative of Indigeneity in the United States. Advocates for this change believe that Columbus has been subject to "adoration", despite many negative aspects to him, including "his arrogance, his poor administration of his colonial ventures and his blinkered conscience, which was untroubled by the enslavement of Native Peoples, even when doing so went against the wishes of his royal backers." This day joins other days of celebration of Indigenous populations, including Native American Heritage Month in the United States, Dia del Respeto a la Diversidad Cultural (Day of Respect for Cultural Diversity) in Argentina, Dia de la Hispanidad (Hispanicity Day) in Spain, Dia de la Resistencia Indigena (Day of Indigenous Resistance) in Venezuela, and International Day of the World's Indigenous Peoples.

=== Intergenerational trauma and Indigenous healing practices ===
Because of the intergenerational trauma that is passed down from each generation to the next due to the violent colonization, healing is an important aspect of resistance. Healing practices include doing work that reverts to the pre-colonized cultural traditional Indigenous work such as weaving, sewing, music, or even active participation in Indigenous community. Along with this, reclaiming sovereignty through storytelling and writing are also forms of Indigenous activism. Writing is a particularly useful tool in healing and activism. It serves as both, "means of surviving oppression and a way to engage in the healing process." The book This Bridge Called My Back, Writings by Radical Women of Color makes this idea a reality, by publishing the honest and creative narratives about Native and Indigenous feminism, and contextualizing these pieces as academia.

== Impact of Climate Change on Indigenous Women ==
Climate change has a profound impact on every facet of the world, including indigenous women. There are significant environmental shifts that come from colonization. Years of adaption is required introducing new diseases, new agriculture, and new practices to a new land. Indigenous communities have lived off of their environmental heavily and sustainably for millennia. With the impact industrialization has had on the Earth, the patterns have started having a profound impact on indigenous women's ability to adapt to these challenges. For the indigenous women of the Americas, temperature increases of the oceans and the Caribbean Sea have led to negative impacts on agriculture routines and practices. When agricultural practices are affected, this can lead to food insecurity and a generational loss of knowledge due to not needing to pass down the information for survival.

== Variations by Nation and region ==
=== Australia ===
Throughout Australian history, much of the activism by Indigenous feminists has advocated for far more than female liberation, but continuously advocated for the liberation of Indigenous Australians as a whole, including the bettering of health care, changes to structural racism in the media and judicial system, as well as improvements to the education system with a more inclusive, bilingual teaching system in the hope to revive Indigenous languages within schools and communities. Feminist movements within the Indigenous community are seemingly never strictly about the bettering of treatment for women, but for the improved quality of life for all Indigenous Australians.

The continued fight for ultimate liberation in Indigenous communities, primarily by women, means seeking re-empowerment as individuals and as a community. This re-empowerment movement first seeks to acknowledge colonisation as a form of disempowerment, to then rebuild and revive Indigenous women's spiritual and cultural practices accompanied by healing. It is acknowledged and believed that a key element of healing the soul of wounds caused by colonisation is for women to tell their stories; stories that have otherwise been erased, distorted or altered to suit the needs of the coloniser. Presently, there are continued debates and protests occurring nationally to change the date or name of Australia's national day which is known as "Australia Day", which celebrates the arrival of the First Fleet to the Australian continent on 26 January. Among Indigenous Australians, the date is known as "Invasion Day"; there have calls to change the day to a different date, due to the traumatizing nature of the day for Indigenous Australians, as well as recommendations to change the name to "Survival Day", to acknowledge the mistreatment and displacement of Indigenous communities. In line with these calls, Melbourne's Yarra Council have ceased holding citizenship ceremonies on 26 January.

=== Mexico ===
Mainstream feminism is often seen by women of color as a movement centered around white, straight, middle-class women. However, the feminist movement as a whole has never been an exclusive movement of the Global North, but rather has roots throughout the world – crossing ethnic, racial and territorial barriers. In Mexico, Mexican feminists stress that their politics vary among their diverse ethnic and social groups, so it is important to challenge perceptions that around what is and isn't considered "feminist." Indigenous feminism is a collective feminism, unlike many forms Western, mainstream feminism that tend to be characterized by individuality and liberal ideology. In Mexico, 7 out of 10 Indigenous women live in poverty and 3 out of 10 in extreme poverty; they are subordinated by their gender but also by their social class and ethnicity.

In Mexico, a movement different from mainstream, liberal feminism has had to be created in order to better represent Indigenous feminist women. As Indigenous feminists belong to not just one but two minority groups, they are usually excluded by non-Indigenous feminists. Hegemonic feminism, along with the term feminism itself, is challenged for its generalizations about women; additionally, both as seen as not recognizing that gender is constructed differently in different historical contexts, and that Indigenous women have their own concept of women's dignity. Feminism in Mexico mainly focuses on making universal demands such as eliminating the wage gap between men and women and ending domestic violence. Mexican feminism often fails to denounce colonialism, racism and economic inequalities as sources of segregation and discrimination against aboriginal women.

Suffering, discrimination and indifference led these women to take up arms, raise their voices and demand active participation against ethnic inequalities. Indigenous women have redefined the profiles of culture, community, rights and customs. According to Lugo, this process can be cataloged as the first signs of Indigenous feminism. With the birth of Indigenous feminism in Mexico, it is proposed to rethink Indigenous people's reality, not only based on their gender identity, but also complementing it with the analysis of their ethnic identity. They demand a transformation of Mexican society and the State, criticizing the nationalism that has led the government and the Mexican inhabitants to rely on patriarchal, lesbophobic and homophobic values that can provoke forms of ethnic violence.

==== The Zapatista and Women's Revolutionary Law ====
Predominantly consisting of the Chiapas Indigenous groups, "Tzeltal, Tzotzil, Chol, Tiobal, Zoque, Kanjobal and Mame", the Zapatista movement has fought for Indigenous Mexican rights. Women play a large role in the Zapatista army and seek "politics without gender subordination," as well as Indigenous rights. Olivera states that "Indigenous peasant women who became integrated as combatants or – in the words of Subcomandante Marcos – 'support networks' (bases de apoyo) accounted for one-third of the EZLN [or Zapatista] membership." The Zapatista's goal is to eliminate race and gender segregation, breaking into a male and mestizo public space where their voices have been silenced. The Zapatista movement resulted in the entrenchment of the Indigenous right to self-determination into the Mexican constitution. Simultaneously, the Zapatistas championed women's rights with Women's Revolutionary Law. Women's Revolutionary Law holds significance to feminism as it is placed alongside the other EZLN laws. Women's Revolutionary Law and the Zapatista women "led to the creation of spaces for Indigenous women from different regions to organize autonomously, promoting a shift in the types of activities and discourses that had characterized their organizing trajectories up to the 1990s."

=== Native American feminism ===
Native American feminism or Native feminism is an intersectional feminist movement rooted in the lived experiences of Native American and First Nations (FNIM) women. As a branch of the broader Indigenous feminism, it similarly prioritizes decolonization, indigenous sovereignty, and the empowerment of indigenous women and girls in the context of Native American and First Nations cultural values and priorities, rather than white, mainstream ones. A central and urgent issue for Native feminists is the missing and murdered Indigenous women crisis (MMIW).

== See also ==
- Gender roles among the Indigenous peoples of North America
- Chicana feminism
- Global feminism
- African feminism
- Women's liberation movement in Asia
- Feminism in Latin America
- Christian feminism
- Jewish feminism
- Islamic feminism
- Women in Hinduism
- Women in Sikhism
- Postcolonial feminism
- Postfeminism
- Romani feminism
- White feminism
- Sámi feminism
- Black feminism
- Ecofeminism
- Marxist feminism
- Anarcha-feminism
- Buddhist feminism
- Transnational feminism
- Womanism
