= Sámi feminism =

Feminist movement of the Sámi people

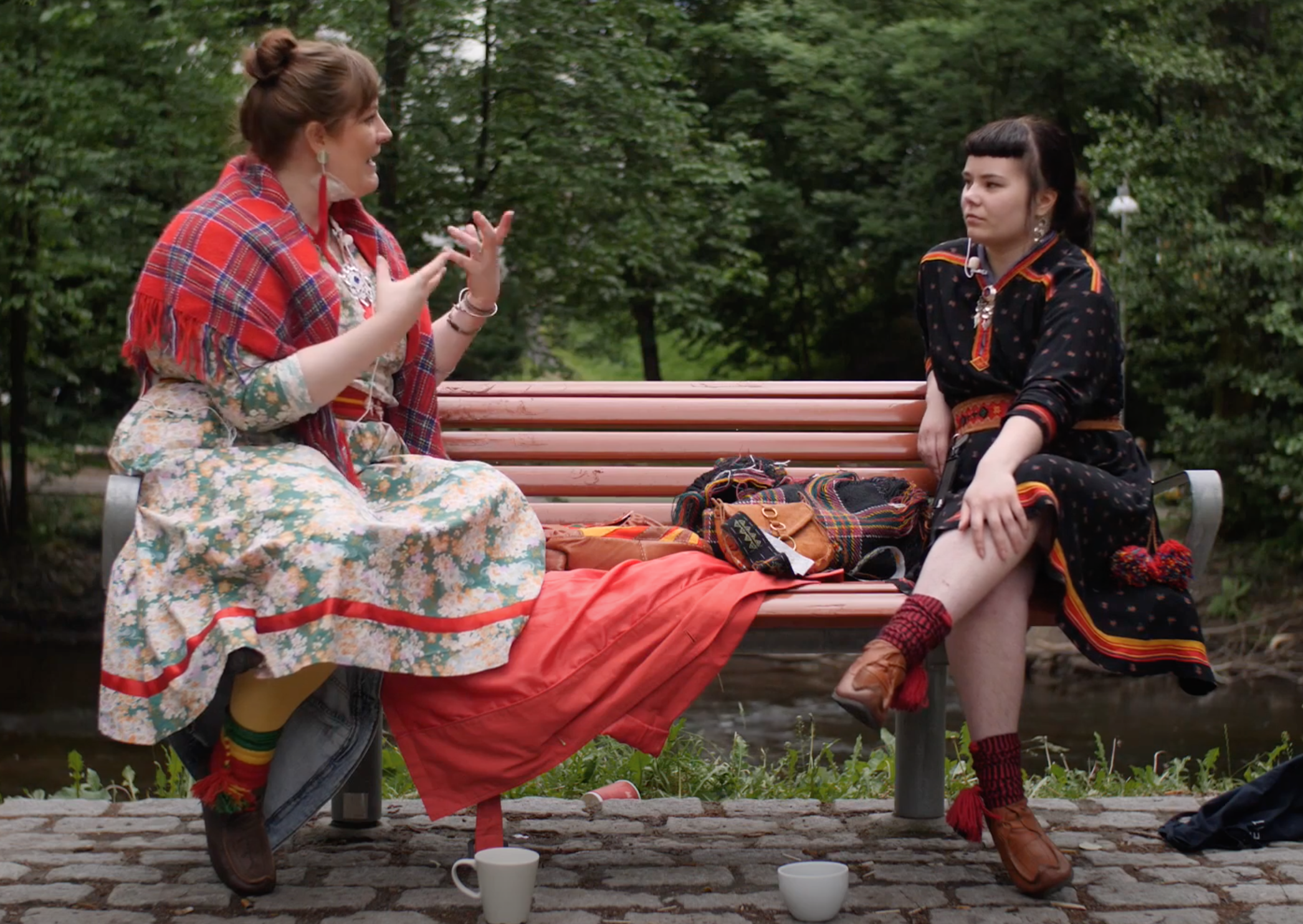
Sámi feminists Maria Karlsen and Liisa-Rávná Finbog speaking during Arctic Art+Feminism, June 2021.

Sámi feminism is the feminist movement among the Sámi people of the Sápmi region of northern Scandinavia. The Sámi people are an Indigenous minority living in Norway, Sweden, Finland, and Russia. Sámi feminism has highlighted the intersecting oppression of Sámi women who face both ethnic and gender-based discrimination.

== History ==
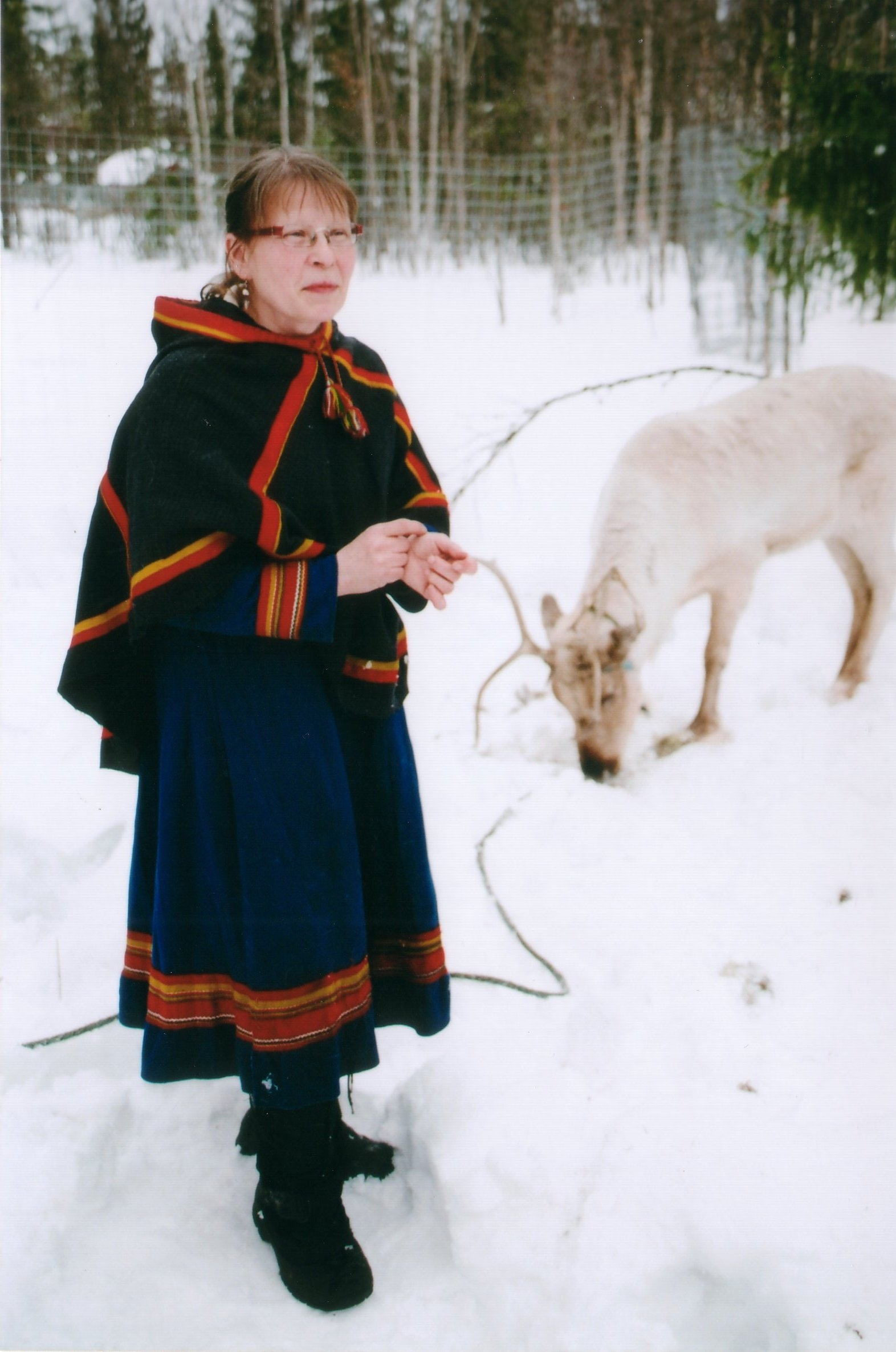
Sámi woman in Sweden with reindeer, May 2006.

Sámi culture traditionally contained certain matriarchal elements. Traditional Sámi gender norms were disrupted and changed by the Norwegian, Swedish, Finnish, and Russian colonization of Sápmi. Many Sámi feminists believe that the Christianization of the Sámi people by colonial governments and Christian missionaries contributed to the emergence of more rigidly patriarchal gender norms within Sámi culture.

The Sámi feminist movement first achieved cultural prominence in the 1970s. The equal status of Sámi women within reindeer husbandry has been an important issue within Sámi feminism.

In Sweden, male violence against Sámi women is an overlooked topic within discussions about domestic violence. Sámi feminist scholars have highlighted the problem of violence against Sámi women, as well as the role colonial power structures have played in Sámi women's experiences of and responses to violence.

== See also ==
- Feminism in Finland
- Feminism in Norway
- Feminism in Sweden
- Indigenous feminism
