= Ismail El Gizouli =

Sudanese civil servant

Ismail Abdel Rahim El Gizouli
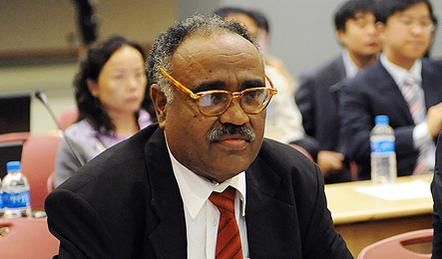
- Ismail El Gizouli during the IPCC 32nd session in Busan (2010).
- Born: Sudan
- Occupation: IPCC interim Chair

Ismail Abdel Rahim El Gizouli is a Sudanese civil servant specializing in energy and environment and a member of the bureau of the Intergovernmental Panel on Climate Change (IPCC). He has acted as interim chairman of the IPCC since 24 February 2015, following the resignation of Rajendra Kumar Pachauri. This appointment will last until the next election for a chairman, which is due to take place at the 42nd session in October 2015.

== Background and career ==
Ismail El Gizouli studied physics and mathematics at the University of Khartoum where he graduated as a Bachelor of Science. He then obtained a master's degree in Operational Research and Statistics at the University of Aston in the United Kingdom.

Gizouli joined the Sudanese Ministry of Industry in 1971. In 1980 he was appointed as head of the Information Systems Section of the Ministry of Energy and Mining, then served as director of the National Energy Administration from 1988 to 1992. He also worked as a freelancer and consultant for various organizations, such as the African Development Bank, the UNEP, and the World Bank, and in 1998 joined the Higher Council for Environment and Natural Resources of Sudan, where he ensured liaison between the Sudanese government and the United Nations (UNDP) for joint projects related to climate change.

Since 2002 Gizouli has been a member of the IPCC bureau, first as vice-chairman of Working Group III (mitigation of climate change), then as Vice-Chairman of the IPCC with effect from October 2010. He contributed to the fourth assessment report and the corresponding synthesis report. As well as holding positions in the IPCC, he was also Vice-Chair of the Facilitative Branch of the Compliance Committee of the UNFCCC between 2005 and 2007 and then acted as Co-Chair of this Committee from 2007 to 2009.

Following a complaint raised against Rajendra Kumar Pachauri by a former employee, Pachauri resigned from his position as the IPCC chair on 24 February 2015, and Gizouli was appointed to act as the interim IPCC Chairman until the next election for the post at the plenary meeting in October 2015.

== Notable publications ==
- Merits of Industrial Investment Act, Industrial Research Institute, Karthoum, 1975
- Energy Supply Management in Sudan, UN, 1983
- Rural, Urban Household Energy Interrelation (Case of Sudan), Zed Books England, AFREPREN Series, 1988
- Towards an Energy Conservation Policy in Sudan, Karthoum, 1992
- Future Energy Requirements in Industry, Transport & Tertiary Sectors in Southern & Eastern African Subregion, African Energy Project, African Development Bank, 1994
- Energy Utilities and Institution in Africa, Zed Books England, AFREPREN Series, 1996
- Pricing, Taxation and Financing of Energy Sector Institutions in Sudan, African Energy Project, African Development Bank, 1994
- Climate Change, Facts & Figures, Karthoum, 1998
