= Black psychology =

Scientific field focused on how people of African descent experience the world

Black psychology, also known as African-American psychology and African/Black psychology, is a scientific field that focuses on how people of African descent know and experience the world. The field, particularly in the United States, largely emerged as a result of the lack of understanding of the psychology of Black people under traditional, Westernized notions of psychology. Overall, the field combines perspectives from both Black studies and traditional psychology encapsulating a range of definitions and approaches while simultaneously proposing its own framework of understanding.

In practice, Black psychology exists as both an academic and applied discipline, which focuses on furthering the well-being of people of African descent through more accurate knowledge. Based on different definitional systems, developments in Black psychology tend to utilize a range of approaches. Overall, the field has contributed to developing Afrocentric models of research, psychotherapy, and well-being, identifying inaccuracies in current psychological frameworks, furthering understandings specific to Black and African-American individuals, and advocating for increased equity and appreciation of Black excellence.

== Definitions ==
Definitions of Black psychology are varied and constitute an ongoing debate within the field. Building off a common framework of the study of Black understandings and behaviors, deviations most commonly arise regarding the specificity of Black psychology. While some theorists (such as William David Smith, Robert Chrisman, and Halford Fairchild) broadly define Black psychology as any attempt to characterize the understandings and experiences of people of African descent, other theorists (such as Joseph Baldwin, Na'im Akbar, Daudi Azibo, Amos Wilson, Shawn Utsey, Asa Hilliard, Wade Nobles, Linda James Myers, and Cheryl Grills) specifically define Black psychology through the lens of African philosophy and heritage. Theorists disagree over what is and what is not considered Black psychology. However, despite varying definitions, perspectives, and approaches in the field, as a whole, Black psychology focuses on the study of the thoughts, behaviors, feelings, beliefs, attitudes, interactions, and well-being of individuals of African descent.

Some noteworthy definitions of Black psychology include:

- Joseph Baldwin/Kobi Kambon: "African (Black) Psychology is defined as a system of knowledge (philosophy, definitions, concepts, models, procedures and practice) concerning the nature of the social universe from the perspective of African Cosmology. ... What this definition means is that African (Black) Psychology is nothing more or less than the uncovering, articulation, operationalization, and application of the principles of the African reality structure relative to psychological phenomena."
- Na'im Akbar: "African Psychology is not a thing, but a place-a view, a perspective, a way of observing. African Psychology does not claim to be an exclusive body of knowledge, though a body of knowledge has and will continue to be generated from the place. It is a perspective that is lodged in the historical primacy of the human view from the land that is known as Africa."
- Halford Fairchild: "African American psychology is the body of knowledge that is concerned with the understanding of African American life and culture…. African American psychology focuses on the mental, physical, psychological, and spiritual nature of humanity. It is the collection of works that has been produced by African psychologists in the United States (African Americans) and throughout the world."
- Robert Chrisman: "Black Psychology has been defined as the study of the behavioral patterns of black people in a social environment that is manifestly antagonistic and unhealthy. ... It is concerned with developing appropriate methodologies and tools required for valid analysis of the black experience, while at the same time criticizing the methodologies and tools of white western psychology."

== History ==
=== Influence of African philosophy and origins of Black psychology ===
==== Ancient Egypt ====
In many ways, Black psychology today has been influenced by African philosophy of the past. The origins of Black or African Psychology can be traced back as far as Ancient Egypt or Kemet (around 3400-600 BCE). During ancient times, its earliest pioneers were concerned with "the development of one's consciousness and with the development and sustaining of positive relationships.

==== The concept of Ma'at ====
One fundamental principle that came out of this time period was Ma'at or how "individuals thoughts, emotions, behaviors and spiritual energy aligned with a principle of truth". This concept was thought to originate from Ra, who was considered by Ancient Egyptians to be the God at the time of creation. Ma'at was considered a code of conduct and could be broken down into seven main virtues. It is also believed that Ma'at "absolutely requires social solidarity for its realization", highlighting the importance of a cohesive community in the application of this concept.

The Seven Main Virtues of Ma'at are as follows.

1. Truth
2. Justice
3. Righteousness
4. Harmony
5. Order
6. Balance
7. Propriety

For a relationship to be sound, it was thought to need to represent and incorporate these seven virtues. This concept of Ma'at is thought to have existed in many African nations such as Egypt, Ethiopia, The Congo, Central African Republic Equatorial Guinea, South Cameroon and Gabon. It also believed that Ma'at serves as the rules by which both humans and Neteru or gods live by. In many way, Ma'at can be simply understood as governing what is the right thing to do. These seven virtues also highlight community philosophical beliefs about what is necessary for healthy and productive relationships.

There are also seven principles of Ma'at that are as follows:

1. There is but one universal order
2. There is one cosmic order
3. There is only one measure
4. There is one cosmic law that precedes all spiritual laws
5. There is only one intelligence
6. There is only one path
7. There is only one reality

Within these seven main principles there exists 42 divine principles, which in many ways are similar to the ten commandments in that they outline what is and is not considered acceptable behavior. They also highlight the importance of unity within African societies, as there is only one cosmic/ universal order outlined in these seven principles.

==== Psyche and Soul ====
According to Ancient Kemetic beliefs at the time, the psyche or soul could be divided into seven related elements.

Seven Elements of the Psyche/Soul are as follows.

1. KA
2. BA
3. KHABA
4. AKHU
5. SEB
6. PUTAH
7. ATMU

The first is KA or "the physical structure of an individual's humanity". KA is also thought to encase all other seven elements in many ways. The second is the BA or "breath of life". This element was believed to originate from the Creator and ancestor and reside in all individuals. The third element is KHABA or "emotion and motion". In this cultural context, motion refers to the natural rhythmic order of things. The fourth element is AKHU or "the capacity for thought and mental perception". The firth element is SEB or the "eternal soul". This particular element was thought to be time-bound, meaning it was thought to develop around adolescence and was thought to be related to the ability to reproduce. The sixth element is PUTAH or "the union of the brain with the conscious mind". The seventh element is ATMU or the "divine or eternal soul". All of these elements are interrelated and in many ways represent the interaction between humans and The Divine, which is critical to many African beliefs.

=== Development ===
Following the end of the Civil War a push for education began to occur in the Black community. Moving away from secret night schools held during the time of slavery, a variety of learning centers and colleges began to open. Many of these schools were established by missionary associations and various Freedman societies. Federal government land grants such as the Morrill Act of 1862 helped to support these institutions and the additional aid of religious denominations allowed for the support of these schools. The years following saw the founding of Black colleges across the country including notable institutions such as the first historically black college Lincoln University (1854), Fisk University (1865), Howard University (1867), Morehouse College (1867) and Spelman College (1881). By 1940 there were more than one hundred Black colleges in the seventeen southern states offering a variety of degrees with many of the earned degrees in social sciences and education.

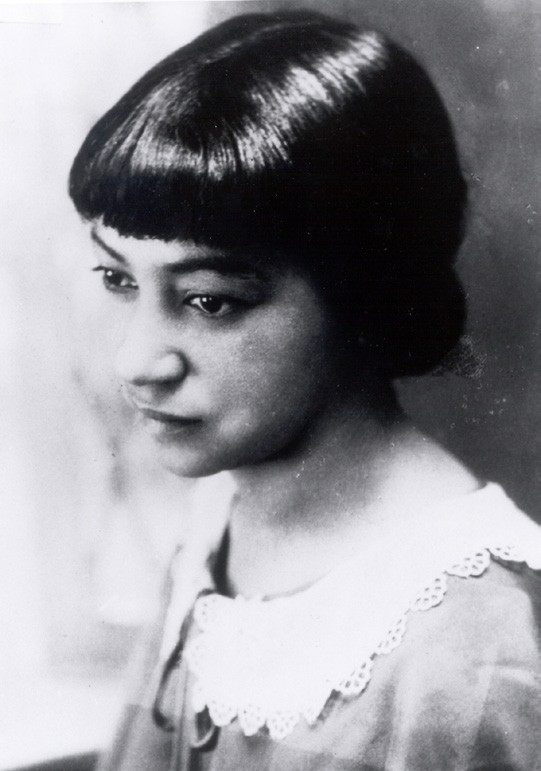
Inez Beverly Prosser

The first African American man to receive a PhD in psychology was Francis Sumner from Lincoln University in 1920. The first African American woman to receive a PhD in psychology was Inez Beverly Prosser from the University of Cincinnati in 1933. Prestigious universities like UCLA, Cornell, and Harvard just to name a few, did not offer African American students the opportunities to receive a PhD in psychology during the 1960s. The first psychology course at Howard University was not offered until 1899, and was listed as "Psychology: The Briefer Course". This was the only course offered until 1906. The department of psychology was not developed until 1926 by Francis Sumner.

Psychology courses became both popular and integral courses in Black colleges, with at least one course appearing as early as 1906. Formally trained professors (both black and white) taught courses. Although many universities had programs of great influence, the most prominent was located at Howard University. Howard's successes were due largely to the efforts of Francis Cecil Sumner. Often considered the father of Black psychologists, Sumner structured the psychology program, teaching not only the ideas of Edward Titchener, John Watson, and Sigmund Freud, but a myriad of courses in topics such as learning, personality, mental hygiene, and experimental psychology. The experimental focus reflected Sumner's three objectives: to provide students preparation in professional fields, stress the cultural significance of psychology, and prepare students who wish to pursue graduate study. This not only made Howard different from other Black universities, but created a strong program that carried over to graduate studies. Although Howard only offered master's degrees, it offered a strong foundation for those who went on to pursue doctoral degrees.

Although psychology was a popular course in Black colleges, only Howard and three other black colleges offered an undergraduate psychology degree by the late 1930s. Emphasis was usually on educational psychology, leaving statistics and experimental focuses by the wayside. This led to a survey conducted by Herman George Canady between 1930 and 1940 concerning the nature of undergraduate courses, research in psychology, and other areas of concern in Black colleges. The survey revealed that fourteen of fifty colleges had a department in psychology and that theoretical and lab courses were rare. Psychology courses were primarily offered by departments of education, allowing the development of educational psychology and emphasizing the focus on practical applications of education.

There were also challenges when it pertained to teaching psychology involving black students and white instructors. Particularly, in the early years, there was a mismatch of interactional norms due to the cultural differences that underpin interactional behaviors, which include different backchanneling responses among Black and White Americans. This can be demonstrated in the incidence of "hyperexplanation", wherein an instructor provides lengthy explanation without recognizing affirmative gestures that do not include vocal backchannels such as "I understand you." This can lead to offense on the part of the black student, who could view the explanation as patronizing.

==== Graduate studies ====
Between 1920 and 1970, black colleges around the nation produced more than 1,300 bachelor's degree graduates who eventually earned a doctorate in psychology. However, difficulties were encountered in attempts to obtain the degree. Many black students were denied acceptance into southern white schools and looked north for educational opportunities. Clark University was the foremost in graduating black scholars at the time; its notable alumni include Sumner and J. Henry Alston. This was not the norm for other schools. Beyond acceptance or provisions that required black students to take on an extra year of undergraduate work to prove their caliber to attending white schools, finances was the most troubling factor. Fees toward tuition, living maintenance, and other expenses caused many to delay or to give up pursuing graduate studies for dependable wages in menial positions. The combination of these factors meant that out of the 3,767 doctorates awarded in psychology between 1920 and 1966 from the ten most prestigious universities in the nation, only eight were awarded to black candidates.

Overall, a survey of prior studies indicates a consensus among psychologists that black psychology and black psychologists play an important role in addressing race-related issues in America aside from its significance in addressing the concept of the negro personality and the psychological issues it entails. For example, Edward Johnson stressed in The Role of the Negro in American Psychology that "the black psychologist will regard himself more and more as an agent of social change."

=== Scientific racism ===
The concept of scientific racism has been present throughout history and often manifested itself in different ways. Historically, psychology has been influenced by other fields, such as anthropology and biology. Beginning with the idea that people could be classified based on race, this quickly gave way to psychological and biological theories describing a natural hierarchy among the different races; on the very bottom of this hierarchy was Black people and other marginalized people. Entire fields arose from these views, such as phrenology, which was the study of cranial shape and size and their relationship to mental abilities. These studies concluded that Black people's skulls and brains were smaller than and hence inferior to those of Westerners. In addition, other scientists like Isidore Saint-Hilaire studied facial structures and concluded that Black people's facial structure were more ape-like. Pseudosciences like these led to the belief that Westerners were physically, mentally, and intellectually superior compared to Black people. Psychology has also adopted many prominent nativist approaches, such as Darwin's theory of evolution, Galton's theories of hereditary intelligence, Mendel's theory of inheritance, and McDougall's instincts theory. This led psychology as a discipline to place a lot of emphasis on the idea that both physical and psychological traits are inherited, thereby perpetuating the negative beliefs and stereotypes about Black people. Among these stereotypes, one of the most frequently studied area was intelligence. Psychologists like George Oscar Ferguson and Peterson concluded that Black children had deficits in abstract thinking and were overall less intelligent than White children. Importantly, this approach also takes away the importance of understanding other factors, such as stereotype threat, that could influence intelligence measurements and other psychological traits, which is important in studying Black psychology and psychology in general.

Along the same lines, Black psychologists like Guthrie argue that the discipline of psychology was also developed from a predominantly White framework. The theories and findings that originate from this framework is then applied to Black populations. Because Black psychology stems from a completely different framework, that is from an African philosophy, many of these findings end up creating norms that are inapplicable to Black people. Moreover, psychological research is often done on samples drawn from Westernized populations. Findings from these studies skew generalizations towards these populations that only account for 12% of the world's population. Both the White framework and the creation of Western norms tend to pathologize attitudes and behaviors that are not typical to White people. This pathologization of Black people in turn has negative consequences on their livelihood and well-being. Hence, scientific racism motivated many notable Black psychologists to found the Association of Black Psychologists, explore psychology through different lenses, and develop Black psychology as a field.

== Major concepts and theories ==
This section organizes the major concepts and theories of Black Psychology according to Kevin Cokley and Rayma Garba's 2018 article "Speaking Truth to Power: How Black/African Psychology Changed the Discipline of Psychology". This article is part of a 2018 special issue of the Journal of Black Psychology honoring the 50th anniversary of The Association of Black Psychologists (ABPsi). This issue focuses partly on "the theoretical revolution/evolution that occurred [among ABPSi], resulting in the domain of African/Black psychology." Cokley and Garba's article specifically discusses how Black Psychology has formed as a discipline within and outside of Eurocentric Psychology. The authors propose three methodological approaches: Deconstructionist, Reconstructionist, and Constructionist, to organize the evolution of major concepts and theories of Black Psychology since the origin of the ABPSi. By using these three methodological approaches the authors "identify the many ways in which Black/African psychology has challenged prevailing beliefs in psychology about Black behavior and culture and forever changed psychological research on Black people."

=== Deconstructionist ===
Black Psychology encompasses many concepts and theories that apply to African Americans. The concepts and theories come from two perspectives. One perspective assumes universality, which means that African Americans can be studied using universal laws, while the other operates from the belief that the study of African beliefs, behaviors, and psychology is essential to the study of African Americans. In a reflection on the field of black psychology, and for the ABPsi's 50th anniversary, Cokley describes three methodological approaches that are characteristic of the work of many black psychologists. The deconstruction method focuses on diagnosing and breaking down misconceptions and inaccuracies that Eurocentric Psychology perpetuates. An example of this is Robert V. Guthrie's book, Even the Rat Was White, where he deconstructed mistruths and celebrates under-appreciated black psychologists. There was a deconstruction movement in the ABPsi that included addressing three challenges that black psychologist were dealing with, and offering suggestions to the American Psychological Association (APA). The challenges included underrepresentation of black psychologists in higher education programs, the APA's neglect of racism and poverty, and a lack of black psychologists in the APA. The challenges led Black Psychologists to request that the APA integrate its workforce, represent African Americans in graduate programs, and reevaluate their programs until the inherent racism in their standardized measurement of black youth is fully addressed. The APA was not the only one fighting this issue. In Even the Rat Was White, Guthrie addresses that Judge Robert Peckham found California to be in violation of the Civil Rights Act due to the use of standardized psychological tests that were culturally biased, racially-biased, and invalid for the purposes of wrongfully placing students into classes intended for students with intellectual disabilities. In addition to the past challenges, there is a western socialization process that paints Eurocentric psychology as the gold standard for diagnosing and treating mental health issues in the world today. The deconstruction method works to change how psychological research conducted with black participants is perceived and defined by researchers. Furthermore, the deconstruction method is used to craft therapeutic techniques that align with the Optimal Conceptual Theory, a theory of human development that is based on African thought and tradition, and led to the freedom of black people from things such as the school to prison pipeline and high infant mortality rates. These therapeutic techniques and theories are aimed to provide psychological liberation for people that have roots in Africa.

=== Reconstructionist ===
The reconstruction method focuses on correcting errors within traditional, Eurocentric psychology so that Black people have access to more culturally sensitive models of psychology. The method specifically examines the ideas of Black self-concept, racial identity, and cultural mistrust. The reconstructionist approach argues that psychology should stop centering the Black self-concept around Eurocentric psychological ideas and instead redefine the Black self-concept as separate. Reconstructionists argue that without differentiating the Black self-concept, traditional psychologists will continue to spread inaccurate narratives about Black people. Some more radical reconstructionists like Wade Nobles, the founder of the Association of Black Psychologists, argue that the Black self-concept should center around African worldviews, like communalism. The reconstructionist approach also highlights the importance of Black racial identity development that rejects Eurocentric concepts of identity. William Cross proposed a prominent model of Black racial identity called the Nigrescence theory. Lastly, the reconstructionist approach examines the ways in which racism influences interactions between Black and White people. Black psychologists working under the reconstructionist framework like Arthur Whaley, Jerome Taylor, and Francis and Sandra Terrell proposed the term cultural mistrust as a replacement to the older term cultural paranoia to refer to the ways in which Black people have developed mistrust towards White Americans due to years of oppression and racism. Black psychologists argued that the word "paranoia" was inappropriate and upheld Eurocentric norms.

=== Constructionist ===
The constructionist approach recognizes Black Psychology as a field grounded in an African worldview and ethos that is distinct and independent from Eurocentric Psychology. Afrocentric psychologists develop paradigms, practices, and methodologies in accordance with the values of the African worldview to address the well-being of African people and eradicate social, economic, and political injustice. This Afrocentric approach emphasizes the agency of people of African descent in creating and sustaining cultural knowledge that not only aids them in their survival of oppression but also enables them to thrive as people outside of the context of this oppression. Notable black psychologists who ground their work based on an African worldview and ethos include Linda James Myers (optimal worldview), Kobi Kambon (Cultural Misorientation), Shawn Utsey (Africultural coping), James M. Jones (the TRIOS Model), Na'im Akbar (alien-self disorder), and Cheryl T. Grills (The Africentrism Scale).

In a practitioner commentary, Martina Dodson discusses the “Strong Black Woman” expectation in relation to emotional exhaustion and seeking support.

== Organizations ==
In 1968, the Association of Black Psychologists was formed as a protest toward the American Psychological Association's lack of interest in African American Psychologists. In 1974, the Association of Black Psychologists created their official journal called The Journal of Black Psychology. This journal is directed toward understanding of experiences and behavior of African American populations. It covers many issues in the African American society, such as, HIV, sickle cell disease, racial identity, African American children, and substance abuse prevention. Psychology fields that are covered in this journal are counseling, clinical, social, cognitive, educational, and organizational psychology.

In 2014, Therapy for Black Girls was created to form an online space dedicated to encouraging the mental wellness of Black women and girls. Therapy for Black Girls focuses on making mental health topics more relevant and accessible for Black women. This platform uses pop culture to illustrate psychological concepts.

The National Queer and Trans Therapists of America launched in May 2016, as a call to organize mental health practitioners to establish a network where therapists can deepen their analysis of healing justice and where QTPoC (Queer and Trans People of Color) community can connect to care. It is a healing justice organization that actively works to transform mental health for queer and trans people of color in North America.

== Prominent contributors ==
=== Founders of Association of Black Psychologists (ABPsi) ===
- Aubrey Spencer Escoffery: A founding member of ABPsi, he earned his B.A. from Columbia, his M.A. from Columbia, and his PhD from University of Connecticut.
- Robert V. Guthrie: A founder of ABPsi. He is most well known for his book Even the Rat was White: A Historical View of Psychology. He was described by the American Psychological Association as "one of the most influential and multi-faceted African-American scholars of the century."
- Reginald Lanier Jones: A clinical psychologist, a college professor, and founding member and past president of the Association of Black Psychologists.
- Wade Nobles: A philosopher and psychologist who focused on African-centered education, healing, and spirituality. He was also a founder and past president of the ABPsi.
- Joseph White
- Robert Lee Williams II: He provided essential research on racial and cultural biases in IQ testing, and created the term Ebonics. He was also a founding member of the ABPsi.
- Other founders: Joseph Akward, Calvin Atkinson, J. Don Barnes, Sylvia O'Bradovich, Ronald Brown, Ed Davis, Harold Dent, Jim DeShields, Russ Evans, George Franklin, Al Goines, Robert Green, Bill Harvey, Thomas Hilliard, Mary Howar, George Jackson, Walter Jacobs, Roy Jones, Luther Kindall, Mel King, De Lorise Minot, Lonnie Mitchell, Jane Fort Morrison, Leon Nicks, Edwin Nichols, Bill Pierce, David Terrell, Charles Thomas, Mike Ward, Samuel Winslow

=== Early contributors ===
- Daudi Ajani Ya Azibo: Azibo is a nationally recognized expert in African-centered psychology. In addition he is the creator of the Azibo Nosology, a diagnostic system of mental disorders directly linked to African-centered personality theory.
- Ruth Winifred Howard Beckham: One of the first African American woman to earn a PhD in psychology.
- John Henry Brodhead: Regarded as an African-American pioneer in the field of psychology.
- Kenneth Clark: First Black president of the American Association of Psychologists. He is known for his work with his wife, Mamie Phipps Clark, on the well-known doll experiment.
- Oran Wendle Eagleson: He was a professor of psychology in Spelman College. In addition, he was the eighth black person in the United States to receive a doctorate in psychology.
- Frantz Fanon: Fanon was a political radical, Pan-Africanist, and Marxist humanist. He mostly focused on the psychopathology of colonization and the human, social, and cultural consequences of decolonization. He formulated a model for community-based psychology.
- Ruth Graves King: The first woman president of the Association of Black psychologists.
- Francis Cecil Sumner: The first African American to receive a PhD is psychology; he is commonly referred to as the "Father of Black Psychology".
- Charles Henry Thompson: The first African American to obtain a doctoral degree in educational psychology.
- Charles W. Thomas: The first president of the Association of Black Psychologists.
- John Egbeazien Oshodi: An African-American Clinical Forensic Psychologist of Nigerian birth, and professor of psychological science, who is a leading figure in the field of African-centered psychology, and developed the theory of Psychoafricalysis also known as Psychoafricalytic psychology.
- Joseph White: White is widely considered the "Godfather of Black Psychology". In 1961, he became the first African-American to earn a PhD in psychology at Michigan State University while also being one of the only five African-Americans in the country to hold a doctorate in psychology. Joseph White contributed to the success of many students of color as well as spent his time working as an advocate for educational reform. He also wrote an article in Ebony in 1970 debunking the fabrication of Black Psychology.

=== African-centered psychologists and philosophers ===
- Na'im Akbar: A clinical psychologist known for his Afro-centric approach to psychology. He is a strong critic of the Eurocentric approach of psychopathology.
- Molefi Kete Asante: An African-American professor and philosopher, who is a leading figure in the field of African studies.
- Kwame Gyekye: Ghanaian philosopher and an important figure in the development of African Psychology.
- John Samuel Mbiti: A Kenyan-born Christian philosopher who researched African cosmologies.
- Niara Sudarkasa: An Africanist and anthropologist who was the first African American woman to teach at Columbia.
- John Egbeazien Oshodi: An American Clinical Forensic Psychologist of Nigerian birth. He developed the theory of Psychoafricalytic Psychology also known as Psychoafricalysis, a foundational perspective in African Centered Psychology that incorporates traditional African historical values and experiences along with current theories of African and Diaspora Psychology.
- Kwame Owusu-Behmpah: A Ghanaian-born psychologist who challenged psychology's racism including the minimization and stereotyping of Black people from popular Western psychology textbooks. He co-wrote The Racism of Psychology (Harvester Wheatsheaf 1994) and Psychology Beyond Western Perspectives (BPS Books 2000).
- Shose Kessi: A South-African psychologist and professor who co-founded the Hub for Decolonial Feminist Psychologies in Africa and who centres Pan-Africanism in her work.
- Floretta Boonzaier: Co-founder of the Hub for Decolonial Feminist Psychologies in Africa. Her interests include critical psychology and domestic violence.

=== Notable African-American psychologists ===
- James Arthur Bayton: an American psychologist who conducted research in the areas of personality, race, social issues, and consumer psychology.
- Albert Sidney Beckham: Pioneering African-American psychologist that made significant contributions to the base knowledge about the racial intelligence score disparities.
- Faye Belgrave: Her work focuses on various aspects of culture to promote well-being in African-American youth. Author of the textbook African American Psychology: From Africa to America, an important text for the field of African-American Psychology.
- Nancy Boyd-Franklin: She is an author of five books focusing on ethnicity and family therapy. She is most well known for her development of home- and community-based therapies servicing African-American families.
- Herman George Canady: Canady was an African-American social psychologist. He is noted as the first psychologist to examine the role of the race of the examiner as a bias factor in IQ testing.
- Mamie Phipps Clark: She performed the well-known Doll Study and served as expert witnesses for one of the Brown vs. Board of Education cases.
- Kevin Cokley: Former Editor-in-Chief of the Journal of Black Psychology, Author of the Myth of Black Anti-Intellectualism, has published over 70 journal articles and book chapters in the areas of racial identity, academic achievement, and the impostor phenomenon and over 30 op-eds on topics such as Blacks rational mistrust of police, police and race relations, racism and White supremancy.
- Beverley Greene: Greene has her PhD in clinical psychology and has published over 100 psychological articles. She has contributed to both fields of race and gender within psychology.
- Cheryl Grills: Former president of the American Association of Black Psychologists. She has contributed greatly to fields of research in African-American psychology and community-based psychology.
- Janet Helms: Well known for her study of ethnic minority issues, specifically for her racial identity theory that has been applied across disciplines.
- Linda James Myers: Professor of African-American Psychology at Ohio State University. She is known for her critiques of traditional, Euro-centric psychology.
- Helen A. Neville: A professor of Psychology who has co-edited 5 books and (co-)authored nearly 90 journal articles and book chapters in the areas of race, racism, and racial identity.
- Claud Steele: A professor of Psychology well known for his work on stereotype threat, the empirical investigation of the performance impact of racist and other discriminatory stereotypes.
- Frederick Payne Watts: Doctor of clinical psychology who produced two important texts for the field of Black psychology. He was the fourth African-American to receive his PhD in psychology.
- Howard Emery Wright: an African-American social psychologist and educator. He served as President of Allen University, in the U.S. Office of Education, and as Director of the Division of Social Sciences at The Hampton Institute. He studied attitudinal testing.

== See also ==
- Association of Black Psychologists
