= Robert V. Guthrie =

American psychologist and educator

Robert Val Guthrie (February 14, 1932 – November 6, 2005) was an American psychologist and educator described by the American Psychological Association as "one of the most influential and multifaceted African-American scholars of the century." Guthrie is most well known for his influential book Even the Rat was White: A Historical View of Psychology, which refuted prior academic work that drew racially biased and inaccurate conclusions about Black people, and profiled often overlooked Black psychologists who made significant contributions to the field of psychology.

== Personal life ==
Robert Val Guthrie was born in Chicago on February 14, 1932, but moved to Lexington, Kentucky, when his father became the principal at Dunbar High School. Living in segregated Kentucky, Guthrie went to Black schools, Black churches, and had friends only in the Black community. In this environment, Guthrie was exposed to limited number of career paths, and intended to be a public school teacher, as other options seemed out of reach.

While stationed at Sampson Air Force Base during his military service in the 1950s, Guthrie met his wife, Elodia Sexton, a nursing student from Guatemala. They married, and went on to have one daughter and five sons together. Guthrie died on November 6, 2005, from brain cancer.

== Education and career ==
To pursue his undergraduate studies, Guthrie attended Florida A&M on a scholarship to play clarinet in the school's band. He was introduced to Psychology for the first time in his early undergraduate courses and he grew passionate about the discipline. Prof. Joseph Awkard, an African American faculty member, exposed Guthrie and his peers to the racial inequities espoused in much of the psychological research of the time; Awkard inspired Guthrie to broaden his horizons and consider becoming a psychologist.

From 1950-1953, Guthrie's schooling was interrupted when he was drafted and served in the Korean War. In the military, he was exposed to a semblance of racial equality for the first time in his life, as the military was desegregated and had many policies discouraging racism. Guthrie was later quoted saying, “it is no secret that the military has done more to level the racial playing field in America than any other environment.”

After the war, Guthrie returned to school to earn a master's degree from the University of Kentucky, which had been newly desegregated in 1954. He was the only black student in the program, and felt unwelcome in the environment, lacking support from the faculty and fellow students. He felt his best option was to "get my education, then get the hell off campus." After receiving his master's, he served in the Air Force until the early 1960s, at which point he moved to San Diego and taught at San Diego High School and Memorial Junior High before becoming the first Black professor at San Diego Mesa College.

In 1968 at an American Psychological Association conference in San Francisco, Guthrie and his colleagues founded the Association of Black Psychologists, a major step for the Black psychology movement. Guthrie then earned his PhD in 1970 at the United States International University in San Diego. The following year, he was hired as an associate professor at the University of Pittsburgh, where he taught until 1973, when he was hired as a Research Psychologist at the National Institute of Education in Washington, D.C., where he studied multicultural issues. In 1976, he returned to San Diego to work at the Navy Personnel Research and Development Center, improving working conditions and personnel interactions in the Navy. He left this post in the 1980s, starting a private practice called Psychiatric Associates of South Bay, which focused on the needs of minorities in San Diego.

He became a tenured professor at Southern Illinois University from 1990 to 1998, drawn by the opportunity to mentor students and expand their horizons the same way he had been inspired by his professors early in his career. After retiring from this post, he taught psychology of the black experience at San Diego State University for one class per semester, and spent time putting his stories and milestones in his life together for a memoir.

== Even the Rat was White ==
In 1976, Guthrie published his most famous work, Even the Rat Was White: A Historical View of Psychology, which exposed a long history of racist work in psychology used to legitimize oppression of African Americans and promote the idea of black inferiority. The 2nd Edition of the book was published in 1998, with responses to new developments in the field, such as The Bell Curve which suggested racial differences in IQ and intelligence between races.

Even more crucial than the examination of racist academic work was the book's work cataloging the work and triumphs of early Black psychologists. While he studied for his master's at the University of Kentucky, one of Guthrie's professors expressed doubts about the importance of contributions by Black psychologists such as Kenneth and Mamie Clark, which inspired Guthrie to begin researching the work of Black psychologists that preceded him. In Even the Rat Was White, Guthrie profiled pioneering Black psychologists and social scientists such as Francis Cecil Sumner, Kenneth and Mamie Clark, Allison Davis, Inez Beverly Prosser, Herman George Canady, Oran Wendle Eagleson, and Ruth Winifred Howard, as well as mentors of Black psychologists like G. Stanley Hall at Clark University who helped create a pipeline for African Americans to earn PhDs in psychology and join university faculties.

== Legacy ==
In the spring of 2001, Guthrie became the first African-American to have his papers included in the National Archives of American Psychology in Akron, OH. The archive's director, David Baker, PhD, said about Guthrie: "We know almost nothing about the development of psychology at historically black colleges and universities, and only Bob Guthrie's work examines this in detail." Regarding Even the Rat Was White, he stated that the book is "an excellent piece of historiography that offers a good, hard look at racism in the development of psychology," and that without it, many of the profiled Black psychologists might have been forgotten. The American Psychological Association described Guthrie as "one of the most influential and multifaceted African-American scholars of the century."

In a tribute written after his passing, the American Psychological Association credited him as a valuable mentor in academia and a caring clinician, going on to say that through his work, "the possibility of a truly inclusive psychology was brought closer to realization," and that his work was key to "helping psychology to recognize its shortcomings, and in moving it toward becoming a more open, diverse, and relevant discipline for all."
