= Na'im Akbar =

African-American clinical psychologist

- Born: Luther Benjamin Weems Jr. April 26, 1944 (age 82); Tallahassee, Florida, United States
- Education: University of Michigan
- Known for: Clinical psychology
- Scientific career
- Fields: Clinical psychology Psychotherapy
- Workplaces: University of Michigan, Morehouse College, Nation of Islam, Norfolk State University, Florida State University

Na'im Akbar (born Luther Benjamin Weems Jr.; born April 26, 1944) is an American scholar, public speaker, and author known for his Afrocentric approach to psychology. Akbar entered the world of Black psychology in the 1960s, as the Black Power Movement was gaining momentum. In the 1970s, Akbar published his first critiques of the Eurocentric psychological tradition, asserting that this model maintained the intellectual oppression of African Americans. Akbar criticized the pathology perspectives that had taken over as the dominant literature on African Americans. Many of his major works cover mental health among African Americans. His workplaces have included the University of Michigan, Morehouse College, the Nation of Islam, Norfolk State University, and Florida State University.

== Biography ==
Na’im Akbar, originally named Luther Benjamin Weems Jr., was born on April 26, 1944, in Tallahassee, Florida. He attended the Florida A & M University Laboratory School, an all-Black school, from kindergarten through high school, and graduated from high school in 1961. As a child of Black middle class parents, Akbar was in an unusual situation at the time as both of his parents were college educated, a rare circumstance for a Black child growing up at the time. His childhood was spent in a segregated southern community in Tallahassee, but he lived in a unique community where “academic excellence was the unquestioned standard”. At a time when Black people lived in both socially and economically oppressed segregated communities, this emphasis on academic excellence was fairly uncommon.

Upon graduating high school, Akbar moved on to the University of Michigan, where he completed his B.A. in Psychology, M.A. in Clinical Psychology, and Ph.D. in Clinical Psychology. Heavily influenced by the Black student movement at the University of Michigan, and freshly aware of racial tensions (his freshman year at Michigan marked his first personal contact with Whites), Akbar became active with the Black Action Movement (BAM) strike which shut down classes at the University of Michigan for three weeks in the late 1960s. His experiences at Michigan helped to set the stage for Akbar to start questioning the normative status quo approach to psychology, which was dominant at the time. Akbar relates that the environment at Michigan lead to “the early conversations that we began to have about a ‘Black Psychology’, and to deconstruct the psychology that we had been taught”.

Working towards his Ph.D. in Clinical Psychology, Akbar wrote a dissertation called "Power Themes among Negro and White Paranoid and non-Paranoid Schizophrenics". In his dissertation, Akbar sought to define and explore the distinctive literature discussing definitions of psychology and mental health for Black people. Through this work, Akbar began to seriously question many of the accepted definitions of mental health for Black people, which had their genesis in European American psychology. Akbar credits this time in his career as the defining point about which his future work would be forged.

After obtaining his Ph.D. from the University of Michigan, Akbar moved to Atlanta to work for the psychology department at Morehouse College, a historically Black college. At Morehouse, Akbar designed and taught the first Black psychology course in the history of the college, and eventually developed the first Black psychology program at the college. After two years of working at Morehouse, Akbar was named chair of the Psychology Department there. Three years later, Akbar left Morehouse to work at the Nation of Islam's headquarters in Chicago. Around this time, Akbar changed his name to Luther X, after joining the Nation of Islam and then later to Na’im Akbar after joining the Muslim American Community of Imam Warith Deen Mohammed then named "The World Community of Al-Islam in The West" where he rose to be Special Aide to Warith Deen Mohammed and oversaw the production of Warith Deen's Teachings of W. D. Muhammad and delivered his personal full page endorsement of the teachings. Akbar created the Office of Human Development, where he remained for two years until he returned to teaching and accepted a position at Norfolk State University, a historically Black university in Norfolk, Virginia. As an associate professor at Norfolk, Akbar crafted and taught courses in Black psychology.

Akbar then moved on to accept a faculty position at Florida State University back in his hometown of Tallahassee, Florida, where he continued to teach courses in Black psychology. In 1971, Akbar joined the Association of Black Psychologists (ABPsi), which is the largest professional organization with focuses on Black mental health in the world. Since becoming active in the organization, Akbar has served on the board numerous times, and served as the President of the ABPsi from 1987 to 1988. Additionally, Akbar has served on the editorial board of the Journal of Black Studies and was the associate editor of the Journal of Black Psychology for eight years.

After teaching at Florida State University for 28 years, Akbar retired in 2008 so that he could put more time and effort into his role as the president of his private consulting and publishing company. Akbar created the private consulting company, Na’im Akbar Consultants, and the publishing company, Mind Productions, in the late 1980s in efforts to broaden his teaching audience. Throughout his career, Akbar has become a distinguished author, writing numerous books and speaking publicly to share his expertise at conferences and interviews. His major contributions to the field of psychology have been centered on the topics of developing an African-centered approach in modern psychology – which for Akbar involves the deconstruction of Eurocentric psychological thought and the subsequent reconstruction/construction of an African psychology that includes the specific historical and cultural experiences of African Americans. Other key topics in Akbar's life work involving the African American family and relationships, cultural diversity, and the Afro-centric perspective.

== Mental Disorder Among African Americans (1991) ==
In his 1991 paper “Mental Disorder Among African Americans,” Akbar maintains his Afro-centric view of psychology, and criticizes the Euro-centric normative definitions of mental illness that were historically used to classify and label numbers of African Americans as mentally ill. Akbar called this abuse “intellectual oppression,” and argued that African Americans should create their own definitions of “normal” and “abnormal” that made meaningful use of an African worldview and was culturally relevant to African Americans. Akbar attributed the failure of society to question these white normative traditions to a phenomenon he called “democratic sanity,” which he paralleled to a majority-rules system. Historically, normality was understood as a function of the behaviors of the majority of the people; thus, when judging African Americans with reference to the behaviors of the dominant class, any deviations in behavior may be considered insane. Akbar subsequently raises questions about the standards used to judge the sanity of African Americans and maintained that cultural considerations were necessary to adequately assess the mental health of African Americans.

In this paper, Akbar identifies four categories of mental illness among African Americans:

1. The Alien-Self Disorder
2. The Anti-Self Disorder
3. The Self Destructive Disorders
4. Organic Disorders

According to Akbar, the “alien-self” disorder is characterized by an individual who rejects their own natural dispositions, and thereby acts in detriment to their survival. This individual is materialistic and denies the social realities of their social and political oppression. He/She attempts to “live in a dream world,” without acknowledging racism, and thus lives in conflict with their true identity. Such an afflicted individual often tries to live as though he/she were a member of the dominant class; he/she seeks to join exclusive clubs and live in exclusive neighborhoods. As a result, this individual ultimately belongs to neither the dominant (European American), nor oppressed (African American) groups, and thus commits himself to a life of identity confusion and ultimately loneliness.

The "anti-self" disorder is similar to the alien-self disorder, but goes a step further and actively holds negative impressions and views of his group. Individuals with this disorder "represent the true 'colonized mentality,'" meaning that they so desire to be part of the dominant group that they take on their very views and dispositions to the detriment of the individual’s group of origin. According to Akbar, the danger in this disorder is that individuals feel comfortable with their alien identification, and are thus unlikely to seek help. Akbar relates that the anti-self disorder is worse than the alien-self disorder, because the individual with the anti-self disorder is more out of contact with reality and is thus more disturbed.

According to Akbar, "victims of self-destructive disorders are the most direct victims of oppression" because oppression is unnatural and inhuman and thus drives the oppressed away from reality. Those with self-destructive disorders try to survive in the hostile environment that oppression creates, but ultimately fail and become self-defeating. These individuals have failed to survive and grow within the society, which systematically oppresses them, and resorts to self-deprecating tactics like doing drugs or becoming a prostitute. Akbar believes that black-on-black crime is a result of self-destructive disorders, and posits that alcoholics and drug addicts resort to a world of chemical fantasies instead of dealing with their own realities.

Organic disorders derive from physiological, neurological, or biochemical failures. Individuals belonging to this group of disorders are severely mentally defective, and overlap greatly with disorders traditionally recognized as schizophrenia. Although traditionally viewed as a physical condition, Akbar posits that organic disorders may stem in part from a disordered and defective environment. According to Akbar, "the oppressive system remains the essential cause of mental disorder within the African American community." Akbar relates that the trend towards charging all types of mental illnesses as organic in nature is merely an effort to downplay the influence of society on mental stability. The African American practitioner must therefore consider such societal influences on mental conditions and look at the social, political, and historical contexts of the patient in considering diagnosis and treatment. Akbar concludes that the creation of an African American definition of normalcy is necessary, and until such a definition is formed, African Americans remain subjects to the power and authority of the dominant community.

== Nigrescence and Identity: Some Limitations ==
In this reaction paper to William E. Cross Jr.'s Nigrescence Model of African American identity development, Akbar reviews some of the limitations that he sees in the model and others articles that have expanded upon Cross' model. Akbar notes that Cross’ theory was drafted as a reaction to the sociopolitical environment at the time, specifically his observations that African Americans in the 1960s began changing their self-perceptions and social behaviors. As such, Akbar relates that Cross' theory must be understood as a reaction to this phenomenon. Akbar's two major qualms with Cross' theory, and the related papers by Parham and Helms, is that 1) the model fails to account for the view that the Black identity is the core context of the self, and 2) the model fails to account for the centrality of spirituality in conceptualization of the Black personality, a crucial element in the Afro-centric perspective.

Akbar also takes issue with the idea that a secure Black identity was realized when the African American became comfortable forging relationships with members of other ethnic groups and cultures. According to Akbar, it makes more sense if a secure Black identity was evident when one was comfortable establishing and maintaining relationships with one's own racial/cultural group members. He likened Cross’ reasoning to an adoption of the alien-self disorder, and argued that Cross’ assumption was flawed.

Additionally, Akbar discussed a potential alternative path of identity formation, not addressed in Cross’ model – the affirmation of one's racial/cultural identity through a positive, rather than a negative encounter. He cited the example of Malcolm X's “real” immersion, which he argues came 20 years after his encounter. This immersion was a result of spiritual change and a personal commitment to the teachings of Elijah Muhammed. Akbar argues that such a path results in a natural emergence of racial/cultural identity, rather than the forced emergence of an identity after a negative encounter. Akbar goes on to say that this positive encounter seems to lead to a more stable identity formation that the one that emerges from a negative encounter, and he cites Malcolm X and W.E.B. Du Bois as examples of this phenomenon.

Akbar also addresses some of the relevant issues regarding Cross' model of Nigrescence and its translation to counseling. Akbar relates that the major unresolved issue for counseling purposes is a problem of definitional clarity. Different counseling solutions are dependent on the perceived cause of African American identity formation; identity formation as a result of a negative encounter or negative social experiences should result in different counseling from identity formation due to a positive encounter, or the affirmation of one's racial/cultural core identity.

== Visions for Black Men (1991) ==
In his book Visions for Black Men, written in 1991, Akbar relates the necessity for Black men to rise to their full potential as leaders in the home and in the community. Akbar wrote the book to try and empower Black men worldwide to become self-determined and fulfill their due roles in society. In the book, Akbar makes a careful distinction between being a male and being a man. To be a man, Akbar relates, is to be conscious of themselves, their actions, and their environments, and to take responsibility for their actions and inactions. Akbar refers to Marcus Garvey, Elijah Muhammad, Warith Deen Mohammed, Booker T. Washington, Martin Luther King Jr., Paul Robeson, and Cheikh Anta Diop as examples of Black men who were leaders and advocates of change.

== "I'm trying to get you free" (2003) ==
Akbar released this spoken word compact disc in 2003, with the goal of spreading his beliefs to a broader audience. When he states “I’m trying to get you free,” Akbar is referring to obtaining a collective freedom of the mind for African Americans. One of Akbar's key philosophies was that true freedom for African Americans was necessitated on a collective cultural perspective viewed from a framework that incorporated the historical and cultural experiences of African Americans. On this disk, Akbar relates such words as, “We are a magical people;” “We are not just Americans;” “Don’t you know what we been through in this land?” in attempts to convey that African Americans have a long and powerful history that they should be proud of.

== Awards and recognitions ==
A distinguished scholar, author, and speaker, Dr. Na’im Akbar has accumulated numerous awards and recognitions throughout his career. He was awarded the Distinguished Psychologist Award from the National Association of Black Psychologists, and Honorary Doctorates of Humane Letters from Edinboro University in Pennsylvania and Lincoln University. Akbar has also been given commemorative days on his behalf in six major cities across the United States, and was named a Development Chief in Ghana, West Africa. Dr. Akbar has also served on the Boards of Directors of numerous organizations, including the National Association of Black Psychologists, for which he served as the president from 1987 to 1988. Akbar has been featured in newspapers and magazines both nationally and internationally, including The Washington Post and Essence Magazine.

== Published work ==
- Akbar, Na'im (1984). Chains and Images of Psychological Slavery.
- Akbar, Na'im (1985). The Community of Self.
- Akbar, Na'im (1992). Visions for Black Men.
- Akbar, Na'im (1994). Light from Ancient Africa.
- Akbar, Na'im (1996). Breaking the Chains of Psychological Slavery. Mind Productions & Associates. ISBN 9780935257052.
- Akbar, Na'im (1998). Know Thyself.
- Akbar, Na'im (2004). Akbar Papers In African Psychology.
- Akbar, Na'im (August 1974). "Awareness: The Key to Black Mental Health". Journal of Black Psychology. 1 (1): 30–37. doi:10.1177/009579847400100104. S2CID 219973971.
- Akbar, Na'im (2004). Rhythmic Pattern in African Personality in "African Philosophy, Assumption & Paradigms for Research on Black Persons". Los Angeles. pp. 175–189.
- Akbar, Na'im (1979). African roots of black personality. Washington, DC: University Press of America.
- Akbar, Na'im (1981). "Mental Disorder Among African Americans". Black Books Bulletin. 5 (2): 18–25.
- Akbar, Na'im (1984). "Africentric social science for human liberation". The Journal of Black Studies. 14 (4): 395–414. doi:10.1177/002193478401400401. S2CID 144882016.
- Akbar, Na'im (1985). Our destiny: Authors of a scientific revolution. "In H. McAdoo and J. McAdoo (Eds.) Black children: Social, educational and parental environments.". Beverly Hills: Sage Publications.
- Akbar, Na'im (1985). Nile Valley origins of the science of mind. New Brunswick, NJ: Journal of African Civilization.
- Akbar, Na'im (1991). Mental disorder among African Americans.
- Akbar, Na'im (1994). Light from ancient Africa. Tallahassee, FL: Mind Productions & Associates, Inc.
- Akbar, Na'im (2001). I'm trying to get you free. Tallahassee, FL: Mind Productions & Associates, Inc.
