= Frederick Payne Watts =

Frederick Payne Watts (1904, Staunton, Virginia – 2007) was an American psychologist. Watts published many professional studies and died in 2007.

== Early life and education ==
Frederick Payne Watts, noted psychologist was born in 1904 in Staunton to Charles H. and Harriett Watts. Watts was one of five mulatto children, three of whom went on to be a physician, a dentist and of course a psychologist. Despite limited income, high educational aspirations were encouraged from an early age. As a child, Watts was influenced by his father who was an avid reader and supported the family through farming or maintenance work, and his mother, who stayed home to raise their five children. Watts was educated in the Washington, D.C. public school system. Upon graduating from Dunbar High School in 1922, Watts attended Howard University. Initially, he planned on pursuing a career in ophthalmology. Soon after enrolling, Watts changed his focus to psychology, as he was interested in “why people misbehave.” During this time, he studied under Albert Beckham who furthered his interest in the field. Watts graduated in 1926 with a Bachelor of Arts degree in psychology and French, and with a teaching fellowship, which allowed him to complete his master's degree. After teaching for a year at Kittrell College in North Carolina, he returned to Washington, D.C. to accept a faculty position at Howard. Before he returned, Beckham left, leaving Watts and Francis Sumner to form the two-person department until Max Meenes joined them in 1930.

== Professional life ==
While at Howard with Sumner, Watts produced two important texts for the emerging literature on Black psychology. Together, they published “Rivalry Between Uniocular Negative After Images and the Vision of the Other Eye” and he independently researched and wrote A Comparative and clinical Study of Delinquent and Non-Delinquent Negro Boys. Watts remained at Howard until 1942, one year after he earned a PhD in clinical psychology from the University of Pennsylvania in 1941. According to the school's officials, he was the first African American to earn a PhD from the university and fourth in the nation to earn a PhD in psychology. A year later, Watts was drafted by the Army. His appointment did not limit his educational or professional interests but rather gave him room for growth. During the time he served, he was a pre-induction classification officer and personnel consultant, setting up psychological testing facilities and supervising counseling of enlisted personnel. Discharged as a captain in the adjutant general's office, Dr. Watts was appointed assistant chief clinical psychologist for the Veterans Administration regional office in Philadelphia”.

== Legacy ==
Watts returned to Howard in 1948 where he worked until he retired in 1970. Upon his return, he started the Liberal Arts Counseling Service which was renamed University Counseling Service, when they expanded it to serve the entire student body. The University Counseling Service not only gave Watts the opportunity to practice his long term passion full-time, but also gave him a permanent location and transient population which allowed him conduct a number of significant institutional studies. Some of the studies he conducted out of the University Counseling Center include Initial Group Counseling of Freshmen, A Study of the College Environment, The Development of a Behavior Judgment Scale, and Developmental Counseling.

In addition to teaching psychology and directing the University Counseling Service, he was a Diplomat in Clinical Psychology (ABEPP) and was affiliated with many of the top professional organizations.

Following his retirement from Howard in 1970, Watts maintained an active interest in counseling and clinical psychology. His wife, Louise Armstead Watts, died in 1974. Dr. Watts lived to be 103 years old. He died of congestive heart failure on April 7, 2007 at the Howard University Hospital. He left four daughters, nine grandchildren and fifteen great-grandchildren.

== Works in depth ==
In 1941, Watts published A Comparative Study of Delinquent and Non-Delinquent Negro Boys. Using the Otis Self-Administering Test of Mental Ability, the Detroit Manual Ability Task, the Healy Pictorial Completion II, the Minnesota Paper Form Board Test, the Woodworth-Matthews Personal Data Sheet, the Personal Index, The Vineland Social Maturity Scale, An Adaptation of the C.E.I. Pupil Data Sheet, and case histories of the delinquents he investigated psychological aspects of delinquent and non-delinquent Negro boys. Watts worked with 92 boys in the Industrial Home School for Colored Children in the District of Columbia and 91 boys from the school they went to before being sent to the Industrial Home. Holding age (all participants were between 14 and 16) and IQ (average of 77) constant, the boys were tested to determine “whether there are: (1) differences in competency to respond to concrete situations as measured by standardized tests; (2) differences in emotional stability and tendencies toward problem behavior as measured by personality tests; (3) differences in social maturity as measured by a social maturity scale; (4) relationships among the various tests administered, and (5) differences as determined through a questionnaire” (Watts, 1941, 192). Watts concluded that when general intelligence and age remain constant, there is no significant difference between delinquent and non-delinquent boys in their competency to respond to concrete situations. He also did not find any notable differences within their tendencies towards problem behavior, emotional stability, and social maturity. He accused oppositional findings of other studies to inadequate control. Watts argues that it is impossible to differentiate between delinquent and non-delinquent Negro boys. He did however find that there were differences in interests, habits, and other general attitudes. Lastly, he noted that the delinquent boys had less parental or adult controls in their lives. Indicating that “further investigation in regard to parental or home control of the groups might lead to establishing useful and significant differences between delinquent and non-delinquent Negro boys.

Along with James Stanfiel, Watts published a study on Freshman Expectations and Perceptions of the Howard University Environment. In this two-part study, Watts and Stanfiel observe incoming freshmen’s initial perception of the school and how they change over time. The authors argue that the college educator should become more familiar with the students' perception of the school as it relates to their personal development. “If the custodians of the educational process are not informed of, and sensitive to, the student’s experience, feelings, and needs, the student may suffer for it. Ultimately, the institution also suffers”. To further advocate this point, they did a study of the Howard University freshmen during the 1965-66 school year. They used (CUES) to assess the relationship between the experience of the student and the policies of the university. CUES is a set of 150 “true” or “false” items describing the college experience. There are five subcategories consisting of thirty questions each. The first category measures “the degree to which personal status and practical benefit are emphasized in the college environment; second, "community" assesses “the degree to which the campus is friendly, cohesive, and group oriented; third, "awareness" measures “the degree to which there is a concern with self-understanding, reflectiveness, and the search for personal meaning; fourth, "propriety" assesses “the degree to which politeness, protocol, and consideration are emphasized; and lastly, "scholarship" looks at “the degree to which serious interest in scholarship and competition for academic achievement are evidenced”. CUES was administered to approximately 1000 Howard freshmen in September and a follow-up was administered in January. The results were compared to CUES from 48 colleges and universities throughout the country, none of which were predominantly black institutions. They found that Howard students expected to be in an environment that focuses on stellar academic performance and fosters and supports social and individual personal well-being. While many of the responses model the national trend of “freshman myth” Howard students had some distinct trends. They were more oriented towards practicality but no so much on awareness and propriety. Further discussions led to questions about the influence on culture and socio-economic factors. In the second administration, they found differences ranging from 11 to 55 percentile points. There were no significant differences in practicality and propriety. While they still perceive the school to have a strong community, it was far from the “interpersonal paradise” they were expecting. Scholarship and awareness fell by 55 and 43 percentile points. The researchers concluded that a sense of disappointment was evident and while it was temporary and mild in some cases, it could also be more enduring and detrimental in others. They argued that the college needed to take initiative in ending these vast misconceptions. They attributed some of the misconceptions to the colleges “over-selling” tactics and also to the popular attitude that college is the “cure-all” in society.

== Works cited ==
- Guthrie, R. V. (1976) Even the Rat was White: a historical view of psychology. New York: Harper & Row
- Stanfiel, J., & Watts, F. (1970) "Freshman Expectations and Perceptions of the Howard University environment", in: The Journal of Negro Education, 39(2), 132-138. Retrieved November 16, 2009, from the JSTOR database.
- Sullivan, P. (2007, April 12) "Psychologist Frederick Payne Watts, 103; Founded Howard U. Counseling Service", in: The Washington Post. Retrieved November 17, 2009, from https://www.washingtonpost.com/wp-dyn/content/article/2007/04/11/AR2007041102282.html
- Watts, F. (1941) "A comparative clinical study of delinquent and non-delinquent negro boys", in: The Journal of Negro Education, 10(2), 190-207. Retrieved November 16, 2009, from the JSTOR database.
