= Lisa Bowleg =

American social psychologist

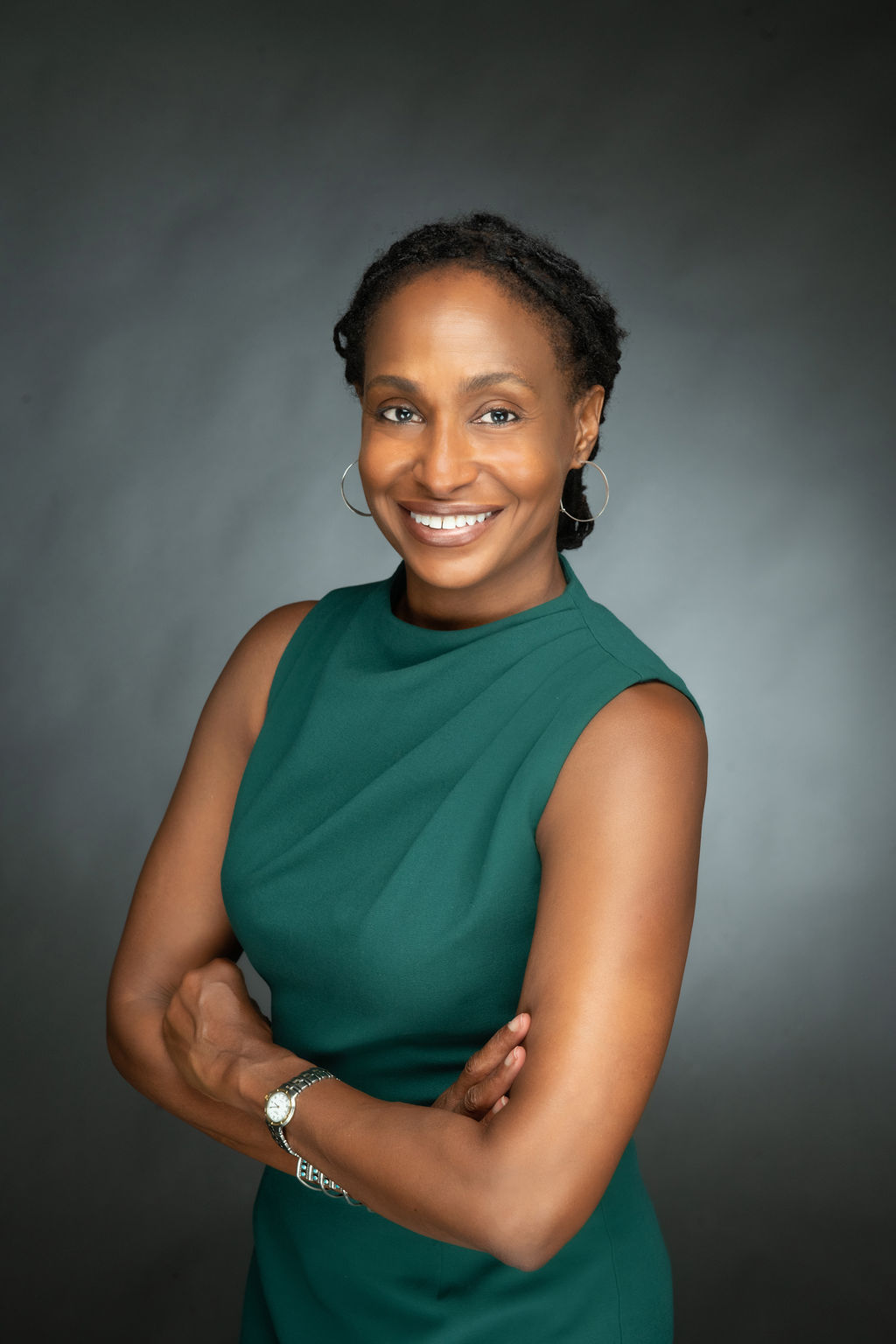
- Occupation: Professor of Applied Social Psychology

Academic background
- Education: Georgetown University (Bachelors); George Washington University (Master's and Ph.D.)

Academic work
- Discipline: Applied Social Psychology
- Institutions: George Washington University
- Main interests: Intersectionality, Discrimination, HIV/AIDS Risk, Sexual Scripts, Social Context
- Website: https://psychology.columbian.gwu.edu/lisa-bowleg

Lisa Bowleg (née: Ingrid Alisa Bowleg) is an applied social psychologist known for conducting research on intersectionality in social and behavioral science and the relationship between social-contextual factors and stress, resilience, and HIV risk in Black communities.

Bowleg works as a Professor of Psychology at George Washington University while working as both Director of the Social and Behavioral Sciences Core of the DC-Center for AIDS Research and Founding Director of the Intersectionality Training Institute at George Washington University.

Bowleg has earned several awards and research grants in addition to conducting numerous original studies throughout her career. As of March 2021, Bowleg has authored over 60 articles, been cited by over 3000 documents (e.g., book chapters or academic articles), and has an H-index of 24.

Bowleg has served on the editorial board of several journals including the American Journal of Public Health, Archives of Sexual Behavior, The Journal of Sex Research, and LGBT Health.

== Early life and education ==
Bowleg is originally from Philadelphia, Pennsylvania.

Bowleg received her Bachelors of Science in Psychology from Georgetown University in 1988. She then went on to receive both a masters in Public Policy with a Concentration in Women's Studies (1991) and a masters in Applied Social Psychology (1996) from George Washington University. In 1997, Bowleg received her PhD in Applied Social Psychology from George Washington University. Bowleg's dissertation research was focused on the role of self-esteem, sexual-esteem, and sexual self-efficacy on African-American college women's HIV/AIDS risk-taking behaviors.

== Academic career ==
Bowleg has been a member of the American Psychological Association since 1992.

In 1998, Bowleg began her academic career at the University of Rhode Island where she conducted and supervised research on HIV/AIDS prevention, LGBTQ issues, women of color and body image, and the various social identities experienced by Black, LGBTQ, and transgender men and women. In 1999 she was the fourth ever recipient of the Louise Kidder Early Career Award. From 2004 to 2006 Bowleg was an assistant professor at the University of Rhode Island.

From 2006 to 2013, Bowleg worked as an associate professor in the Department of Community Health and Prevention at the Drexel University School of Public Health, in Philadelphia, Pennsylvania. While at Drexel, Bowleg worked closely with University of Missouri Professor Michelle Teti to study how men maintain positive mental health by investigating shared protective factors in well-adjusted men. In 2009, Bowleg worked with Randy Sell, Seth Welles, and Augusta Villanueva to launch the Drexel University Program for LGBT Health.

Since 2013, Bowleg has been a Professor of Applied Social Psychology in the Department of Psychological and Brain Sciences at George Washington University and is the founding director of the Intersectionality Training Institute at George Washington University and the Director of the D.C. CFAR Social and Behavioral Sciences Core.

In 2013, Bowleg also served on the board for the Center for LGBTQ Studies (CLAGS) at the Graduate Centre for the City University of New York (CUNY).

Bowleg is currently an associate editor for the American Journal of Public Health (AJPH) and since September 2018 has been the editor of the Perspectives from the Social Sciences section of the AJPH. She is currently also a consulting editor for the Journal of Sex Research, and on the editorial board for both the Archives of Sexual Behavior, and LGBT Health.

== Research ==
Bowleg's PhD was overseen by Faye Z. Belgrave and focused on the implications of gender roles, power strategies in relationships, and precautionary sexual self-efficacy for Black and Latina women's HIV and AIDS protective behaviors. Currently, Bowleg's research addresses the psychological development of members of "invisible populations" in relation to gender and race. She is known for her research regarding intersectionality, stress, and resilience among Black LGBT+ people. Bowleg has studied the effects of social-structural context, masculinity, and resilience on black men's sexual HIV risk and protective behaviors. Her work has encouraged the conversation regarding stigmatized topics in the black community such as homosexual behavior as well as emotional well-being.

From 2007 to 2012, Bowleg was awarded a total of $1.7 million in funding from the Eunice Kennedy Shriver National Institute of Child Health and Human Development (NICHD) for a project on "Gender Role Norms, Sexual Scrips and Black Men's Heterosexual Risk Behaviors". For this project, Bowleg and colleagues developed and validated the Black Men's Experiences Scale (BMES), which is used to assess Black men's negative experiences with microaggressions and overt discrimination and positive evaluations of being Black men. This project also investigated the link between sociocultural factors (e.g., racial discrimination, poverty, incarceration) with gender role norms, sexual scripts, and sexual risk for African American men who have sex with women (MSW's). To aid this specific line of research, Bowleg and colleagues developed the Sexual Scripts Scale (SSS) which measures sexual scripts pertaining to romantic intimacy, condom, alcohol and marijuana use, sexual initiation, media sexual socialization, and sexual experimentation. Funding for this project was renewed in 2008 and 2009, amounting to a total of $1.7 million in funding.

In 2011 Bowleg received a $354,495 research grant from the National Institute on Minority Health and Health Disparities (NIMHD) for a project titled "Opening the Doors for Diverse Populations to Health Disparities Research." This project addresses barriers to health disparities that disadvantaged groups experience. Specifically, funding for this project supported the enrollment of undergraduate, graduate, and medical school students from various economically, socially, and/or environmentally disadvantaged groups in the Drexel University School of Public Health's Opening the Doors for Diverse Populations to Health Disparities Research Program. This project was transferred to PI Shannon P. Marquez in 2012 who received renewed funding in 2012, 2013, 2014, and 2015 amounting to a total of $1.6 million.

From 2012 to 2018, Bowleg was Co-PI with Anita Raj and Jay G. Silverman on a National Institute of Mental Health (NIMH) funded project titled "Evaluating a Structural and Behavioral HIV Risk Reduction Program for Black Men." As part of this project, Bowleg evaluated the epidemiological risk of HIV for heterosexual Black men in the United States as a community-based problem. For this project, Bowleg and colleagues also conducted a qualitative study to investigate both the reduction of HIV/STI risk, a novel healthy relationship intervention, and the efficacy of contextual factors on participation in peer counseling sessions with a focus on The Stroman Effect. This project received NIMH funding in 2012, 2013, 2014, 2015, and 2016 amounting to a total of $3.1 million.

From 2012 to 2018, Bowleg was also the lead PI on a project titled "Social-Structural Stressors, Resilience, and Sexual Risk Behaviors Among Black Men." Over a 5 year period, this cross-sectional and mixed methods study implemented geospatial analyses, qualitative methods, and multilevel modeling to evaluate a novel conceptual model. This model includes a number of factors such as neighborhood-level sociodemographic stressors and resilience, individual-level sociodemographic stressors and resilience, Black men's sexual HIV risk, protective factors, and other psychological risk-factors. In total, this project had three phases. Phase I involved collecting data on social-structural stressors from focus groups in Philadelphia, PA. In Phase II, a probability sample of 700 Black men (ages 18 – 44) were collected from Census block-groups to inform a multilevel-model of sociodemographic and social-structural stressors. Finally in Phase III the study's results were integrated with spatial data visualization and confirmed through additional focus groups. To support this research, Bowleg was awarded $575,996 in funding from the National Institutes of Mental Health in 2016.

Through her affiliation with the DC Center for AIDS Research, Bowleg has recently begun research on the influence of multilevel intersectional stigma on hindered of HIV testing and pre-exposure prophylaxi (PrEP) among Black gay/bisexual or other men who have sex with men in the DC Metropolitan Area.

In 2018, Bowleg was awarded a series of research grants for a research project titled "Reducing Black Men's Drug Use and Co-Occurring Negative Mental and Physical Health Outcomes: Intersectionality, Social-Structural Stressors, and Protective Factors." Specifically, this five-year project (ending in 2023) will use mixed methods longitudinal data collected from 960 Black men (ages 18 – 54) in Washington, D. C. to further test conceptual models of social-structural stressors and protective factors with drug use and negative mental and physical health. This project has three phases. In Phase I, self-report longitudinal data on social-structural stressors, protective factors, mental health, and drug use will be collected. In Phase II, four focus groups will be used to confirm the interpretation of results from Phase I. Finally in Phase III the results will be synthesized and validity will be assessed. This project received a total of four research grants from the National Institute on Drug Abuse (NIDA) between 2018 and 2020 amounting to a total of $2.1 million. A further $1.6 million in grant funding was awarded by the U.S. Department of Health and Human Services and the National Institute of Health resulting in a total of $3.7 million in funding for this project.

In 2019 Bowleg started work as a PI on a National Institute of Mental Health (NIMH) funded project titled "Developing and Validating New Measures of Multilevel Intersectional Stigma to Improve the HIV Prevention Continuum for Young Black Gay Bisexual and Other Men who Have Sex with Men in the South." This project aims to investigate novel self-report measures of intersectional stigma, develop objective measures of social-structural stigma, and develop new visualizations of spatial stigma focusing on young Black gay, bisexual, and other men who have sex with men in Washington, DC and Jackson, MS. Funding for this project was renewed in 2020, amounting to a total of $449,439.

== Awards ==
- (2014) Psychology and AIDS Distinguished Leader Award; American Psychological Association Committee on Psychology and AIDS (COPA).
- (2012) President's Award for Intercultural Engagement & Diversity; Drexel University
- (2009) Certificate of Appreciation from the American Psychological Association Behavioral and Social Science Volunteer Program
- (2008) Red Ribbon Award for Research from the University of Pennsylvania Center for AIDS Research Community Advisory Board
- (2007) Honorable Mention, Carolyn Payton Early Career Award, American Psychological Association Society for the Psychology of Women (Division 35)
- (2006) Teacher's Appreciation Award, Uhuru SaSa, African American Student Association at the University of Rhode Island
- (2002) Diversity Award for Faculty Excellence in Leadership and Service from the University of Rhode Island Multicultural Center
- (2001 - 2002) Rhode Island Board of Governors for Higher Education Excellence in Technology Award
- (2000) Margaret Stetz Woman of Distinction Award from the Georgetown University Women's Center
- (1999) Louise Kidder Early Career Award from the Society for the Psychological Study of Social Issues of the American Psychological Association (APA)
- (1996) American Psychological Association Science Directoriate Dissertation Research Award
