= Nancy Boyd-Franklin =

American psychologist and writer

- Born: Nancy Boyd; June 13, 1950 (age 76); Harlem, New York, U.S.
- Education: Swarthmore College
- Alma mater: Teachers College, Columbia University (MS, PhD)
- Known for: Psychology of the black family; Psychosocial and therapeutic issues of HIV/AIDS
- Scientific career
- Fields: Psychology
- Workplaces: University of Medicine and Dentistry of New Jersey; Rutgers University; National Pediatrics HIV Resource Center; Children's Hospital AIDS Program
- Thesis: Clinicians' perceptions of Black families in therapy (1977)

Nancy Boyd-Franklin (born June 13, 1950) is an American psychologist and writer. She is the author of five books and numerous articles on ethnicity and family therapy, and was invited by President Bill Clinton to speak at the first White House Conference on AIDS.

== Life and education ==
Boyd-Franklin was born in Harlem, New York City, on June 13, 1950, to Regina and Rudolph Boyd. Her father was a police officer and her mother a teacher. Her mother's family came from Jamaica and her father's family from North Carolina. She was raised in the Bronx with her three siblings.

After graduating high school, Boyd-Franklin attended Swarthmore College, where she earned her bachelors of science in 1972. She continued her studies of clinical psychology at Teachers College, Columbia University, earning her Masters of Science in 1974 and her doctorate in 1977. Boyd-Franklin has stated that her interest in pursuing psychology stems from her wanting Black families to benefit from the psychological work she was doing, noting that her goal was to "change the way the field looked at [Black] families."

Boyd-Franklin is married to Dr. Anderson J. Franklin, who is also a psychologist. The couple has one child together, and she is the step-mother of Franklin's three kids from a previous marriage.

In her work, she includes personal anecdotes for readers to relate to that give insight into her own life and family; such as her reference to "The Talk" in her book Adolescents at Risk in which she describes the discussion of police brutality with Black children. She also speaks to her experience, both personal and professional, with ensuring the inclusion of Black men in the process of treating patients, couples or families, and how other factors, like power dynamics, are crucial to understand in order to combat the assumptions in therapy based on gender.

== Work ==
Boyd-Franklin is a distinguished professor of psychology at the Graduate School of Applied and Professional Psychology at Rutgers University. As a professor at Rutgers, Nancy Boyd-Franklin has taught, and continues to teach, five different courses– Advanced Supervision in Family Therapy, Advanced Family Therapy, Supervision with African-American Families, Family Therapy, and Psychological Intervention with Ethnically and Racially Diverse Populations. Her books include Black Families in Therapy: A Multisystem Approach; Children, Families, and HIV/AIDS: Psychosocial and Therapeutic Issues; Reaching Out in Family Therapy: Home-Based, School and Community Intervention with Brenna Bry, PhD; and Boys Into Men: Raising Our African American Teenage Sons with A.J. Franklin, PhD. Boyd-Franklin attributes the ideas in the first edition of Black Families in Therapy to the work she did in a community mental health center at the University of Medicine and Dentistry in Newark, NJ. The second edition of her book Black Families in Therapy: Understanding the African American Experience was published in 2006. This book was then put on Self Magazine's 9 Books by Black Therapists to Help You Process Your Emotions in the summer of 2020, following the murder of George Floyd.

Outside of writing books, Boyd-Franklin has also published articles including Mentoring, Scholarship, and the Professional Extended Family: The Legacy of Dr. Joseph White, a tribute to the work of Dr. Joseph White, the recognized founder of Black Psychology. She is known for developing home-based and community-based therapies servicing Black families, bringing psychology to the clients instead of waiting until clients come to the clinic. This system helps to organize and implement a treatment plan at the nuclear family, extended family, and systems levels. Boyd-Franklin also established the Rutgers-Somerset Counseling Program, which is a school and community-based prevention program created to address the increase in aggression and violence in female students.

== Awards ==
In 1974, Boyd-Franklin was named Thomas J. Watson Fellow, which allowed her to study language and community in East and West Africa. 1991, she was cited for her Pioneering Contribution to the Field of Family Therapy by the American Family Therapy Association. In 1994, Boyd-Franklin was named Distinguished Psychologist of the Year by the Association of Black Psychologists. Boyd-Franklin received an honorary doctorate from the Phillips Graduate Institute in 2006. She was also awarded for Outstanding Contributions to the Theory, Practice and Research on Psychotherapy with Women from Division 35 of the American Psychological Association (APA) in 1996, the Carolyn Attneave Diversity Award from Division 43 of the APA in 1995, and the Charles and Shirley Thomas Award from Division 45 of the APA in 2001. In addition, she has also received awards from the Association of Black Social Workers and the American Psychiatric Association. Boyd-Franklin was given the Janet E. Helms Award from Teachers College, Columbia University in 2013, and the Ernest E. McMahon Award from Rutgers University.
