= Wade Nobles =

African-American psychologist

Wade W. Nobles
- Citizenship: American
- Education: Stanford University (PhD)
- Occupations: Psychologist, professor
- Employer(s): San Francisco State University; Institute for the Advanced Study of Black Family, Life and Culture
- Known for: Pioneer of the African-American psychology movement Founding member of the Association of Black Psychologists
- Title: Professor emeritus
- Spouse: Vera Lynn Winmilawe Nokwanda DeMoultrie
- Children: 5
- Parent(s): John Nobles; Annie Mae Cotton

Wade W. Nobles is a professor emeritus in the Department of Africana Studies at San Francisco State University and notable pioneer of the African-American psychology movement.

== Biography ==
Dr. Nobles' grandparents were born into American slavery. His parents, Annie Mae Cotton and John Nobles, chose the name Wade, meaning "one who is able to tread through difficult matter like mud, snow or ignorance." Nobles earned his PhD in psychology from Stanford University. He is married to Vera Lynn Winmilawe Nokwanda DeMoultrie (PhD), with whom Nobles has five children and 11 grandchildren. Nobles belongs to the Ifá spiritual system.

== Academic career ==
Dr. Nobles is the founding Executive Director of the Institute for the Advanced Study of Black Family, Life and Culture, Inc. in Oakland, California, an independent organization whose sole objective is the betterment of black family life and culture. The institute performs both social work and scientific research. Nobles was a founding member of the Association of Black Psychologists, where he served as national President from 1994 to 1995. An experimental social psychologist, Dr. Nobles focuses his research on such topics as African psychology, Black self-concept, African-American family dynamics, and African-centered education, healing, and spirituality. Nobles co-leads the “Enyimnyam Project,” created with the objective of connecting African diaspora diasporic Africans with Africans from the continent.

== Publications ==
Dr. Nobles has authored over 100 articles, research reports, chapters, and books, including African Psychology: Toward its Reclamation, Reascension and Revitalization, Seeking the Sakhu: Foundational Writings in African Psychology, and The Island of Memes: Haiti’s Unfinished Revolution. Island of Memes, inspired by Nobles' visit to Haiti following the 2010 earthquake, focuses on the roles of Haitian religion and class systems in its recovery from natural disaster and uses memes as cultural indicators. Among Nobles' scientific publications is his article "Extended self: Rethinking the so-called Negro self-concept," which critiques Euro-Americans' research about African Americans on the basis of their fundamental misunderstanding of group differences and misapplication of Euro-centric norms. Similarly, his article "Africanity: Its Role in Black Families" criticizes social science research defining the black family as disorganized and pathological, as it is performed by non-black researchers with negative assumptions of black family life.
