= William K. Lyles =

American psychologist (1919–2001)

William Karyle Odell Lyles (1919-2001) was an African American psychologist and one of the founders of the Association of Black Psychologists.

== Early life and education ==
Lyles was born in North Carolina to Nettie Lou (Scales) and Solomon Lyles. He had a younger brother, Alfred Francis Lyles, and a younger sister, Virginia.

In 1938, as a student at Winston-Salem Teachers College, he was recognized by the Omega Psi Phi fraternity under direction of Frederick S. Weaver for his essay on the assigned topic of "The Negro and the Field of Journalism".

== Military service ==
During World War II, from November 1942 to February 1946, he served in the U.S. Army, reaching the rank of master sergeant and serving in Europe and Asia.

== Academic career ==
After earning his doctoral degree from New York University in 1958, he became a professor of psychology and student dean at the City University of New York.

He was the associate chief psychologist in the psychiatry department at Bronx Lebanon Hospital.

He was a member of the Society for Personality Assessment, then called the Society for Projective Techniques.

He co-founded the New York chapter of the Association of Black Psychologists, where he served as chapter president multiple times and created the Nelson Mandela Award.

He was the president of the Association of Black Psychologists at the national level from 1983 to 1984.

== Publications ==
His 1958 doctoral dissertation at New York University was "The Effects of Examiner Attitudes on the Projective Test Responses of Children: A Study of the Significance of the Interpersonal Relationship in the Projective Testing of Children."

== Personal life ==
He had a son, Don Lyles.

In 2000, he recalled: "We fought hard against Jim Crow laws, we would not accept them."
