= Helen A. Neville =

American psychologist

- Education: California State University, Northridge; University of California, Santa Barbara
- Awards: Distinguished Psychologist of the Year Award from the Association of Black Psychologists (2011)
- Scientific career
- Fields: African-American studies; Counseling psychology; Educational psychology
- Workplaces: University of Missouri; University of Illinois at Urbana–Champaign
- Thesis: The impact of a cultural awareness program on the racial attitudes and social behaviors of first-year college students (1993)
- Doctoral advisor: Michael Furlong

Helen A. Neville is a professor of educational psychology and African-American studies at the University of Illinois at Urbana–Champaign, where she has taught since 2001. She previously served on the faculty of the University of Missouri, where she was the co-founder and co-director of the Center for Multicultural Research, Training, and Consultation. She received the Association of Black Psychologists' Distinguished Psychologist of the Year Award in 2011 and was a Fulbright Scholar in Tanzania in 2015–2016. She served as president of Division 45 of the American Psychological Association, the Society for the Psychological Study of Culture, Ethnicity, and Race, in 2018.
