= Kobi Kambon =

African-American psychologist (1943–2018)

- Born: Joseph A. Baldwin; November 29, 1943; Jasper, Alabama
- Died: December 31, 2018 (aged 75)
- Education: DePaul University; Roosevelt University; University of Colorado Boulder
- Employer: Florida A&M University
- Known for: African (Black) Psychology

Kobi Kazembe Kambon (a.k.a. Joseph A. Baldwin; November 29, 1943 – December 31, 2018) was an American educator and psychologist. His research has been particularly influential in areas relating to African (Black) Psychology, cultural survival in the face of cultural oppression, and mental health. A former National President of the Association of Black Psychologists (ABPsi), Kambon published over 60 scholarly articles, and wrote five books, including two textbooks that are frequently used in Psychology and Black Studies courses across the country.

In many of his published works, Kambon took an Afrocentric approach to the study of African Americans, suggesting that while Black personalities are biogenetic in origin, they are still subject to environmental variables that, when alien (not African), can serve to inhibit and interfere with normal development of the Black personality. He developed various tools, including the African Self-Consciousness Scale (ASCS), The Worldviews Scale (WVS), and the Cultural Misorientation Scale (CMS), in order to measure personality, mental health, and social variables that relate to and may characterize the Black experience in the context of Western culture. Kambon retired from his position as department chair and professor in the Psychology Department at Florida A&M University in 2014 following a 30-year career at the institution.

== Early life and education ==
Kobi Kazembe Kambon (a.k.a. Joseph A. Baldwin) was born in Jasper, Alabama, November 29, 1943. His mother, Mable E. Guyton- Baldwin was a schoolteacher and community-civic leader who died in 1996 at the age of 92. His father, Andrew Baldwin Sr., was first a coal miner and then a Baptist minister who died in 1969 at the age of 76. Kambon was the 9th of 10 children, with four sisters and five brothers.

He attended Walker County Training School for junior high school and high school, and attended Wilson Jr. College in Chicago. Kambon was briefly drafted in the army from 1965 to 1967.

Kambon transferred to DePaul University in Chicago in 1969, where he received his bachelor's degree in psychology. He then acquired a Master of Arts degree in personality-abnormal psychology from Roosevelt University in 1971 and a Ph.D. in personality and social psychology from the University of Colorado Boulder in 1975.

== Academic career ==
During his 30-year career at Florida A&M, Kambon held the role of department chair from 1985 to 1997, and also served as Coordinator of the Community Psychology Graduate Program. Kambon's emphasis on Afrocentric views shifted the Psychology Department as a whole towards a more African centered perspective, and Kambon is credited with inspiring a dramatic increase in Psychology graduates of African descent from Florida A&M, making it one of the highest producing departments in the country in that respect.

Kambon wrote, developed and contributed to over 60 scholarly publications, including five books. He was the author of two text books, titled African/Black Psychology in the American Context (1998) and The African Personality in America (1992), that have been used and praised by scholars and students at institutions across the country. Kambon also developed various instruments and measures to assess Black personality and mental health variables.

== Major contributions ==
=== African (Black) psychology: issues and synthesis ===
In his article African (Black) Psychology: Issues and Synthesis, Kobi Kambon provided a general overview of his Africentric approach to studying the psychology of Black Americans. He argued that while most Black psychologists recognize the need for a Black psychology, some fail to consider that it might be an undertaking that is entirely separable from Western Psychology. Kambon suggested that to study Black psychology as contained within Western Psychology is to ignore African cultural and philosophical antecedents, thereby framing modern Black psychology as a set of mere reactions to Western culture and oppression. Kambon called much of this work "Western psychology in blackface", referring to the psychologists involved as conceptually incarcerated thinkers, stuck within a Eurocentric framework of psychology.

Kambon insisted that it is reasonable to conceptualize an African (Black) Psychology as existing independently of Western Psychology based on the fact that African cultures existed, and even preceded Western cultures. Race, he argued, "constitutes the principal binding condition underlying the evolution of definitional systems which in their most basic fundamental nature have a 'racial component'." Thus, African psychologies initially evolved within African definitional systems. A problem emerges, however, when an alien definitional system, or worldview, is foisted upon a people for whom the worldview was not designed, and within which they are negatively viewed.

This, Kambon argued, is the context in which Black individuals are expected to exist and thrive, despite the fact that a European reality structure is a definitional system that does not give legitimacy to African social realities. Given this cultural and psychological "incarceration", Kambon advocated for a Black psychology that allows African Americans to consciously resist European reality structures in favor of an African worldview that affirms their existence, thereby restoring what Kambon called "Africanity" to its centrality in the Natural Order.

=== Mental health of African Americans ===
In much of his work, Kobi Kambon evaluated African American mental health issues in terms of an Africentric approach to African (Black) psychology. In his article African Self Consciousness and the Mental Health of African Americans he touched on the prevalence of mental health disorders in African American populations, and suggested that Western oppressive forces are extremely potent in their effects on African American psychology.

== Legacy ==
Kobi Kambon influenced the field of African (Black) psychology, contributing to conversations about how a Black psychology should be defined and studied in relation to White psychology and culture. Straying from what Jackson (1979) terms the reactive and inventive approaches to a study of Black people, Kambon chose to focus solely on the psychology of African Americans as something uniquely African, and therefore functionally independent from White Psychology. This framework empowers people of African descent to seek out and embrace African cultural histories and worldviews, which fundamentally oppose European worldviews and their associated psychologies, according to Kambon.

Kambon's position on these issues was profound, in that it completely challenges the theoretical underpinnings of Western psychology, and calls into question its ability to say anything meaningful or useful about African (Black) psychology. An appreciation of Kambon's arguments therefore points to a research approach that is entirely different from that taken up by Western Psychologists. Kambon has centered his research on this approach, and Black psychologists around the country have certainly been influenced by his Africentric model as well.

== Other scholarly works ==
- Baldwin, J. A.; Bell, Y. R. (1985). "The African Self-Consciousness Scale: An Africentric Personality Questionnaire". Western Journal of Black Studies. 9 (2): 61–68.
- Baldwin, J. A. (1985). "Psychological Aspects of European Cosmology in American Society: African and European Cultures". Western Journal of Black Studies. 9 (4): 216–23.
- Baldwin, J. A. (1981). "Notes on an Africentric Theory of Black Personality". Western Journal of Black Studies. 5 (3): 172–79.
- Baldwin, J. A., & Hopkins, R. (1990). African-American and European-American cultural differences as assessed by the worldviews paradigm: An empirical analysis. The Western Journal of Black Studies.
- Baldwin, J. A.; Duncan, J. A.; Bell, Y. R. (1987). "Assessment of African self-consciousness among Black students from two college environments". Journal of Black Psychology. 13 (2): 27–41. doi:10.1177/009579848701300201. S2CID 145681827.
- Baldwin, J. A. (1980). The psychology of oppression. Contemporary black thought, 95–110.
- Bell, Y. R., Bouie, C. L., & Baldwin, J. A. (1990). Afrocentric cultural consciousness and African-American male-female relationships. Journal of Black Studies, 162–189.
- Baldwin, J. A., Brown, R., & Hopkins, R. (1991). The black self-hatred paradigm revisited: An Africentric analysis.
- Jamison, D. (2016). Kobi K.K. Kambon (Joseph A. Baldwin): Portrait of an African-centered psychologist. http://journals.sagepub.com/doi/abs/10.1177/0021934716653354
