= Linda James Myers =

American psychologist (*1948)

Linda James Myers (born 1948) is an American psychologist of African American and Native American ancestry, who is best known for developing a theory of optimal psychology. Optimal psychology theory relies on African and Native American worldviews to promote interconnectedness and anti-racism. James Myers has offered significant contributions to the field of African Psychology. She has won numerous awards, including the Distinguished Psychologist Award from the Association of Black Psychologists, the Bethune/Woodson Award for Outstanding Contributions in the Development of Promotion of Black Studies from the National Council for Black Studies, and the Oni Award from the International Black Women’s Congress.

== Early life and education ==
James Myers was raised in western Kansas by her father, a rancher, and her mother, a schoolteacher. She attended Kansas State Teachers College for her undergraduate degree in psychology and special education and for her master's degree in school psychology. Upon receiving her degree, James Myers took a position as a psychology instructor at the University of Nebraska–Lincoln. Finding that a doctorate degree would be necessary for an academic faculty position, she pursued a PhD in clinical psychology at Ohio State University.

== Theory of optimal psychology ==
James Myers is known for having developed the theory of optimal psychology, deeply informed by her African American and Native American ancestry. Optimal psychology first aims to understand why or how someone might adopt white supremacist beliefs. James Myers suggests that Western cultures understand knowledge and reality through the senses, while African wisdom traditions understand knowledge and reality through the spirit.

According to James Myers, the Western way of understanding knowledge through the senses places value on external accomplishments and status, leading to "suboptimal" ways of relating to others. Optimal psychology theory instead places value on interconnectedness among all living beings. James Myers' theory bridges a gap between ancient African wisdom and current developments in neuroscience and quantum physics. Though optimal psychology is rooted in African and Native American ideology, James Myers is specific in describing her idea that optimal psychology can lead to unity across all cultures.

== Academic career and selected publications ==
James Myers is a professor emerita at Ohio State University in the Department of African American and African Studies. She served as the president of the Association of Black Psychologists from 1990 to 1991. James Myers has authored numerous books, book chapters, and peer-reviewed journal articles.

James Myers' first book, Understanding of Afrocentric Worldview: Introduction to an Optimal Psychology, was published in 1988. This book offered a summary of James Myers' theoretical and empirical work around optimal psychology theory. Since then, James Myers has continued to write about optimal psychology, race, and culture, publishing Our Health Matters: Guide to an African (Indigenous) American Psychology and Cultural Model for Creating a Climate and Culture of Optimal Health in 2003, Re-Centering Culture and Knowledge in Conflict Resolution Practice in 2008, and contributing to the Ethical Standards of Black Psychologists in 2021.

== Awards and honors ==
- Distinguished Psychologist Award from the Association of Black Psychologists
- Bethune/Woodson Award for Outstanding Contributions in the Development of Promotion of Black Studies from the National Council for Black Studies
- Oni Award from the International Black Women’s Congress
- Building to Eternity Award from the Association for the Study of Classical African Civilization
- Outstanding Teaching Award from the Ohio State University College of Arts and Sciences
