= Herman George Canady =

American psychologist (1901–1970)

Herman George Canady (October 9, 1901 – December 1, 1970) was an American social psychologist. Canady, who was black, followed Horace M. Bond (1927) in examining the role of the race of the examiner as a bias factor in IQ testing.

== Early life ==
Canady was born in 1901 in Okmulgee, Oklahoma, to Rev. Howard T and Mrs. Anna Canady. He attended Douglass Elementary School and Favor High School in Guthrie, Oklahoma. He graduated from the high school at George R. Smith College in Sedalia, Missouri, in 1922. In 1923, Canady enrolled in the Northwestern University Theological School as a Charles F. Grey scholarship student, where he developed an interest in the behavioral sciences and majored in sociology. He began his education with the hopes of becoming a minister, however, after graduating in 1927 with a sociology major and a psychology minor, he continued his behavioral science studies at Northwestern, where he earned an M.A. in clinical psychology.

== Education ==
- 1927 B.A. sociology and a minor in psychology from Northwestern University
- 1928 M.A. clinical psychology from Northwestern University
- 1941 Ph.D. in psychology from Northwestern University

== Career ==
In September 1928, Canady's career began when Francis Sumner left the position of chair of the psychology department at the West Virginia Collegiate Institute (now West Virginia State College). From 1936 to 1939, as chair of the psychology department at West Virginia, Canady conducted and published a plethora of socio-psychological studies. As a psychologist, one of his most monumental contributions was examining the role of the examiner or proctor in IQ testing. Canady's article in the Journal of Negro Education, titled "The Effect of 'rapport' on the I.Q.: A new approach to the problem of racial psychology", reported his findings in this area (that rapport between the examiner and the test-taker can have a significant impact on the results of the test) and offered suggestions to improve the situation.

In 1939, a General Education Board fellowship allowed Canady to take a leave of absence from West Virginia to go back to Northwestern to complete his Ph.D. in psychology. After earning his doctorate in 1941, Canady returned to West Virginia as chairman, continuing his work as a psychologist.

Outside of his accomplishments at West Virginia, Canady also taught as a visiting lecturer at schools and colleges in collaboration with the American Friends Committee in 1946. In 1947, he acted as a consultant for the Pacific Coast Council on Intercultural Education and Intercultural Projects in the San Diego School system. From 1948 to 1953 he worked part-time as a clinical psychologist for the Mental Health Unit at the Veterans Administration in Huntington, West Virginia, and from 1947 to 1968 he worked at the West Virginia Bureau of Mental Hygiene.

Canady was also honored as a Fellow of the American Association for the Advancement of Science and Fellow of the American Psychological Association. He was a member of the American Teachers Association, the American Association of University Professors, the West Virginia State Psychological Association, the West Virginia Academy of Science, and the West Virginia State Teachers Association.

Canady retired from West Virginia State University in 1968, after forty years as chair of the psychology department.

== Movement to organize black psychologists ==
Canady's discontent with the lack of psychological research focused on the black experience led him to spearhead a movement to organize black professionals in psychology. In particular, Canady wished to draw more attention to the hardships faced by black youth and the obstacles to their employment. At this time, a psychology for black Americans did not exist. Rather, cross-cultural assumptions led to consideration of the problems of black Americans from the perspective of a psychology determined by white Americans. At this time, only a few black psychologists were members of the American Psychological Association, and the mission of the organization did not address the psychology of black Americans.

As southern chapters of the National Educational Association (NEA) prohibited black teachers from joining the organization, black educators organized to form the American Teachers Association (ATA) (formerly called the National Association of Teachers in Colored Schools) in 1904. Through his membership in the ATA, Canady began to organize black psychologists. Canady composed A Prospectus of an Organization of Negroes Interested in Psychology and Related Fields and sent the document to ATA members who either worked in psychology or were interested in the cause. He proposed the formation of a psychology section within the ATA. The objective of the department would be "to advance, promote, and encourage the teaching and application of the science of psychology and related fields, particularly in Negro institutions." Among many stated purposes, the prospectus proposed efforts to assist black institutions with the educational preparation and hiring of black psychologists. Additionally, the document proposed efforts specific to predominantly black institutions in order to cultivate interest in psychology amongst black students and to enhance research programs, including their emphasis on psychological problems as they pertain to black Americans.

At the two-day ATA Tuskegee Convention held at the Tuskegee Institute in 1938, Canady presented his ideas to members of the organization and they unanimously voted for the formation of a Department of Psychology within the ATA. Canady was elected chairman of the group. At this conference, psychologists also contributed to discussion pertaining to the convention theme, "The Negro Youth Looks at Occupations in America."

Although World War II shifted attention away from Canady's efforts, psychologists organized thirty years later in San Francisco, California, in 1968 to discuss similar concerns. During an APA convention, about 200 black psychologists met to discuss the failure of the APA to address the role of blacks in psychological research. Joseph White, an influential black social psychologist, said that those present at the meeting were "dissatisfied with psychology's exploitations and the white definitions for behavior that placed Blacks in a negative light."

== Selected works ==
One of Canady's most influential articles was "The Effect of 'Rapport' on the I.Q.: A New Approach to the Problem of Racial Psychology." He was the first psychologist to address the effect of the race of the examiner on subjects taking I.Q tests. Canady questioned the reliability of tests given to Black children by White examiners due to effects of "rapport." He hypothesized that significant differences would exist between the I.Q. scores of Black children tested by a White as opposed to a Black examiner. The participants in Canady's study consisted of 48 Black and 25 White elementary school children from Evanston, Illinois. The Stanford Revision of the Binet-Simon measuring scale was administered to the children twice. The examiner conducting the second test was unaware of how the child scored on the first test. 23 Black subjects and 18 White subjects were tested first by a Black Examiner and again by a White examiner. The other subjects (25 Black and 7 White) were tested first by a White examiner and next by a Black examiner. The Black children's average gain in I.Q points when tested by a Black examiner was about the same as the White children's average drop in I.Q. points when tested by a Black examiner. This respective average gain and loss was about 6 points. 18% of subjects showed an increase or decrease of over 10 points. As other studies have reported changes of about 5 I.Q. points from one test to the next retest in children, as well as over 10 point changes in about 10-15% of cases, Canady concluded that the point differentials reported in his study could not be attributed to the races of the examiners. While Canady's study failed to demonstrate significant differences in I.Q. due to rapport with the examiner, his study spawned numerous future studies investigating effects of the race of the examiner on the results of the test-taker. There has been significant controversy as to whether the effects are significant. While many studies have found significant improvements in performance on intelligence tests when the test-taker is examined by a member of their own ethnic group, many studies have also failed to substantiate this finding. Studies have found relationships between the race of the examiner and intelligence test scores for children with high mistrust of a member of an outgroup

Canady also attempted to bring attention to the current state of education in psychology at predominately black colleges. In his study, "Psychology in Negro Institutions," he investigated the psychology programs at 40 of the top predominately black universities in nation. He evaluated the extent to which psychological education was available, as well as the undergraduate courses in psychology, the resources of the department, the faculty, and the research productivity. Questionnaires designed to obtain the above information were sent to administrators at the most well-respected 50 predominately black colleges in the country. 47 colleges agreed to participate in the study. Results indicated that only 30% of the institutions had psychology departments, while the other 70% combined psychology departments with education, philosophy, or sociology. Only 4 of the 47 institutions offered a major in psychology. The remaining institutions reported that they did not have enough psychology courses or trained psychologists to offer the major. While the APA recommended a full-year introductory psychology course at the time, most of the institutions surveyed only offered half-year introductory courses. Despite the importance of exposing psychology students to experimental methods, only one institution required laboratory work as part of introductory psychology courses. Many of the institutions reported that they would mandate laboratory work if they had adequate resources. Only two institutions offered a Race Psychology course. Of the 32.6% of instructors teaching psychology courses who were trained in psychology, only 30% held doctorate degrees in psychology. Only 8 of the 88 total psychology instructors at the institutions had published significant research in the past five years. Additionally, Canady suggested that, while many of the courses taught across the nation pertained to applied psychology, too few addressed issues of theoretical psychology.

In his research, Canady also drew attention to false beliefs regarding gender differences. In "A Study of Sex Differences in Intelligence-Test Scores Among 1,306 Negro College Freshmen," American Council Psychological Examinations of 637 males and 669 females who attended West Virginia State College were analyzed. Canady concluded that there were no significant differences in "general intelligence" between the males and females. He did find significant differences between male and female performance in the sub-tests included in the intelligence test. The males outperformed the females in numerical sections of the test while females outperformed males on verbal sections of the test.

== Legacy ==
Through publications such as "Adapting Education to the Abilities, Needs, and Interests of Negro College Students" and "Psychology in Negro Institutions", Canady contributed to efforts to increase educational opportunities for Black students and fought to attain equal rights for Black Americans. Furthermore, his role in organizing Black psychologists in the 1930s led to the formation of the Department of Psychology within the ATA. This event was crucial to the development of a Black Psychology in the United States. Prior to the gathering of Black psychologists at the ATA conference in Tuskegee, Alabama, the issues faced by Black Americans were mainly considered from the perspective of a White-centric psychology.

Echoes of Canady's work can be seen in the current psychological theory of intergroup anxiety. One proposed cause of intergroup anxiety cites perceived negative stereotypes leading members of an ingroup to experience anxiety when interacting with a member of the outgroup. Thus, if a Black child mistrusts Whites and perceives them as threatening, they may experience increased anxiety when interacting with a white examiner, leading to poor performance on a test. Canady's study, "The Effect of 'Rapport' on the I.Q.: A New Approach to the Problem of Racial Psychology" was the first to address the issue of the race of the examiner as it interacts with children's performance on I.Q. tests. Furthermore, studies building off of Canady's original study have found significant relationships between Black children's mistrust of Whites and poorer test performances when tested by White as opposed to Black examiners.

Traces of Canady's work can also be seen in stereotype threat research. Stereotype threat has been demonstrated to increase when identification with a negatively stereotyped group leads to the expectation of discrimination. According to stereotype threat theory, if the presence of a White examiner were to activate stereotype threat in Black children and led to the expectation of discrimination, their performance on intelligence tests would decrease. This result is predicted by Canady in his study investigating the effect of "rapport" between White examiners and Black children.

== Family ==
He married Julia Witten in 1934 and together they had two children, Joyce A. and Herman G. Canady.

== List of publications ==
- Dissertation
  - Adapting Education to the Abilities, Needs and Interests of Negro College Students
- Journal of Negro Education
  - "Individual Differences and Their Educational Significance in the Guidance of the Gift and Talented Child"
  - "A Study of Sex Difference in Intelligence- Test Scores Among 1,306 Negro College Freshmen"
  - "The Effect of 'Rapport' on the I.Q.: A New Approach to the Problem of Racial Psychology"
  - "The Social Psychology of Youth"
  - "Individual Differences Among Freshmen at West Virginia State College"
  - "Psychology in Negro Institutions"
  - "A Scale for the Measurement of the Social Environment of Negro Youth"
- The American Journal of Sociology
  - "The Intelligence of Negro College Students and Parental Occupation"

== Books ==
- (1939). Psychology in Negro institutions
- (1941). Test standing and social setting: a comparative study of the intelligence-test scores of Negroes living under varied environmental conditions.
- (1954). The psychology of the American Negro.

== Memberships and associations ==
- Sigma Xi fraternity
- Alpha Kappa Delta
- Kappa Alpha Psi
- Fellow of the American Association for the Advancement of Science
- Fellow of the American Psychological Association
- American Friends Services Committee (1946)
- Chairman of the Department of Psychology of the American Teachers Association (1938–1945)
- Chairman of the Department of Psychology at West Virginia Academy of Science (1952–1953 and 1955–1956)
- American Association of University Professors
- West Virginia State Psychological Association (President from 1954 to 1955)
- West Virginia State Teachers Associations

== Awards and honors ==
- 1923 Charles F. Grey scholarship
- 1939 General Education Board fellowship
- 1949 Alpha chapter of Omega Psi Phi fraternity Man of the Year
- 1950 Designated Diplomat for American Board of Examiners in Professional Psychology
- 1951 Kappa Alpha Psi fraternity Middle-Eastern Provincial Achievement Award
- Northwestern University's Alumni Merit Award
- Honorary doctor's degree from West Virginia State College
