= Amos N. Wilson =

American philosopher

- Born: Amos Nelson Wilson; February 23, 1941 or 1940; Hattiesburg, Mississippi, United States
- Died: January 14, 1995 (aged 53); Brooklyn, NY
- Education: Morehouse College; The New School of Social Research; Fordham University
- Scientific career
- Fields: Psychology, Sociology, Black Studies
- Workplaces: CUNY, New York Institute of Technology

Amos Nelson Wilson (February 23, 1941 (or 1940) — January 14, 1995) was an African-American theoretical psychologist, social theorist, Pan-African thinker, scholar, author and a professor of psychology at the City University of New York.

== Early life and education ==
Born in Hattiesburg, Mississippi, in 1941 Wilson completed his undergraduate degree at the Morehouse College in Atlanta, Georgia in 1964, master's degree at The New School of Social Research, and attained a PhD degree from Fordham University in New York. Wilson worked as a psychologist, social caseworker, supervising probation officer and as a training administrator in the New York City Department of Juvenile Justice. As an academic, Wilson also taught at City University of New York from 1981 to 1986 and at the College of New Rochelle from 1987 to 1995. He was also an adjunct instructor for several colleges in the New York City area, including New York Institute of Technology. On January 14, 1995, Wilson died from complications of stroke at a local hospital in Brooklyn, NY. He was 53. His survivors include a son, Raheem.

== Views on power and racism ==
According to AALBC.com, "Wilson believed that the vast power differentials between Africans and non-Africans was the major social problem of the 21st century. He believed these power differentials, and not simply racist attitudes, was chiefly responsible for the existence of racism, and the continuing domination of people of African descent across the globe—white people exercise racism because they have the power to do so."

As a scholar of Africana studies, Wilson felt that the social, political and economic problems that Blacks faced, the world over, were unlike those of other ethnic groups; and thus, he argued that the concept of "equal education" ought to be abandoned in favor of a philosophy and approach appropriate to their own needs. Wilson argued that the function of education and intelligence was to solve the problems particular to a people and nation, and to secure that people and nation's biological survival. Any philosophy of education or approach which failed to do so was inadequate.

The idea that we must necessarily arrive at a point greater than that reached by our ancestors could possibly be an illusion. The idea that somehow according to some great universal principle we are going to be in a better condition than our ancestors is an illusion which often results from not studying history and recognizing that progressions and regressions occur; that integrations and disintegrations occur in history.

— Amos Wilson, The Falsification of Afrikan Consciousness [in] Cole (2000)

Wilson further argued that the mythological notion of progress to which many Blacks subscribe, was a false one; that integration could only occur and persist, as a social-economic reality, so long as the U.S. and global economies continued to expand. If such an economic situation were ever to reverse, or change for the worse, then the consequences which would follow could end up resulting in increased racial conflict; thus he urged Blacks to consider disintegration as a realistic possibility — to prepare for all hypothetical scenarios — with the understanding that integration was not guaranteed to last forever.

Wilson also believed that racism was a structurally and institutionally driven phenomenon derived from the inequities of power relations between groups, and could persist even if and when more overt expressions of it were no longer present. Racism, then, could only be neutralized by transforming society (structurally) and the system of power relations.

== Books ==
- The Developmental Psychology of the Black Child (1978)
- Black-on-Black Violence: The Psychodynamics of Black Self-Annihilation in Service of White Domination (1990)
- Understanding Black Adolescent Male Violence: Its Remediation and Prevention (1992)
- Awakening the Natural Genius of Black Children (1992)
- The Falsification of Afrikan Consciousness: Eurocentric History, Psychiatry and the Politics of White Supremacy (1993)
- Blueprint for Black Power: A Moral, Political and Economic Imperative for the Twenty-First Century (1998)
- Afrikan-Centered Consciousness Versus the New World Order: Garveyism in the Age of Globalism (1999)
- The Developmental Psychology of the Black Child — Second Edition (2014)
- Issues of Manhood in Black and White: An Incisive Look at Masculinity and the Societal Definition of Afrikan Man (2016)
- The Psychology of Self-Hatred and Self-Defeat: Towards a Reclamation of the Afrikan Mind (January 1, 2020)
