= Halford Fairchild =

American psychologist

Halford H. Fairchild
- Born: March 16, 1949 (age 77)
- Education: University of California, Los Angeles, California State University, Los Angeles, University of Michigan
- Spouse: Heather F. Fairchild
- Scientific career
- Fields: Psychology
- Workplaces: Pitzer College, University of California, Los Angeles, California State University, Los Angeles
- Thesis: An ecological analysis of interracial attitudes and behaviors in american high schools (1977)
- Doctoral advisor: Patricia Gurin and James S. Jackson

Halford Hosoi Fairchild (born March 16, 1949) is a Professor Emeritus of Psychology and Black Studies at Pitzer College in Claremont, California. He was the editor of Psych Discourse: The Monthly Newsjournal of The Association of Black Psychologists from 1991 until 2014. He is a former president of the Association of Black Psychologists and Chairman of the Intercollegiate Department of Africana Studies at the Claremont Colleges. He received his Ph.D. in psychology from the University of Michigan in 1977. Professor Fairchild published a series of papers that challenged the practice of scientific racism within psychology (e.g., Fairchild, 1991; Fairchild, Yee, Wyatt, & Weizmann, 1995; Yee, Fairchild, Weizmann, & Wyatt, 1993).
