= Joseph White (psychologist) =

American psychologist (1932–2017)

Joseph L. White
- Born: December 19, 1932; Lincoln, Nebraska, U.S.
- Died: November 21, 2017 (aged 84)
- Education: San Francisco State University; Michigan State University
- Known for: Toward a Black Psychology; Association of Black Psychologists
- Scientific career
- Fields: Psychology
- Workplaces: University of California, Irvine; California State University, Long Beach; Association of Black Psychologists

Joseph L. White Jr. (December 19, 1932 – November 21, 2017) was an American scholar who served as professor of psychology and psychiatry at the University of California, Irvine. He is widely regarded as the "godfather" of the field of Black psychology.

== Early life and education ==
Joseph White was born on December 19, 1932, in Lincoln, Nebraska to Dorothy Lee and Joseph L. White Sr. At a very young age, his family moved to Minneapolis where they remained until White's mother sent him to San Francisco to live with his aunt after completing high school. White only intended to work as a waiter; however, his aunt, Reverend Margaret Brown, suggested that he go to college.

As an African American child growing up before the Civil Rights Movement, White experienced a society shaped by racial segregation, discrimination, and unequal educational opportunities. After his family relocated to Minneapolis and later to San Francisco, he encountered different social environments that exposed him to both the barriers and possibilities facing Black Americans in the mid-twentieth century. These experiences helped shape his later commitment to developing a psychology that accurately reflected the strengths and lived experiences of African Americans.

Joseph White received his BA from San Francisco State University, and his PhD in clinical psychology at Michigan State University in 1961. Paying an admission cost of $14.25. White was a good athlete in high school which earned him a job working at a playground in a city neighborhood. This is where he found his love for psychology. Ivan Pavlov was an influential psychologist for White, likely being his earliest influence in regards to psychology.

When White completed his Ph.D. in clinical psychology at Michigan State University in 1961. He became the first Black student at Michigan State University to earn a doctorate in clinical psychology. At the time, African Americans were severely underrepresented in doctoral psychology programs. White later noted that he was among only a handful of Black psychologists in the United States, highlighting the significant barriers faced by Black scholars pursuing careers in psychology during the early 1960s. He was one of only five Black psychologists in the United States when he earned his doctorate. This fact illustrates just how isolated Black psychologists were in the early 1960s and helps explain why White believed psychology needed to change. His success represented an important milestone in increasing diversity within the profession.

== Career ==
After he finished at San Francisco State, White served 24 months in the military. He did not immediately get accepted into graduate school. Luckily, San Francisco State was creating a Master's program and agreed to admit him to the program and help him gain admission to a doctorate program. Two years later, he was accepted at Michigan State.

Following military service, White encountered barriers to graduate education that reflected the racial inequalities present within higher education during the late 1950s. Despite completing advanced coursework at San Francisco State College, he was required to repeat much of his graduate training after enrolling at Michigan State University because his previous academic work was not fully recognized. White later described the skepticism he encountered as one of the few African American graduate students in psychology, recalling that many faculty questioned whether Black students possessed the intellectual ability to succeed at the doctoral level. Rather than discouraging him, these experiences strengthened his commitment to challenging racial bias within psychology and higher education.

White's work establishing the Educational Opportunity Program (EOP) at California State University, Long Beach represented far more than a student support initiative. The program was designed to increase access to higher education for students from historically underrepresented racial, ethnic, and economically disadvantaged backgrounds by providing academic advising, financial assistance, mentoring, and institutional support. The success of the original program led to its adoption throughout the California State University system, where EOP continues to serve thousands of students annually. White viewed educational access as an essential component of social justice and believed that universities had a responsibility to address structural barriers rather than expecting students to adapt to institutions designed around White middle-class norms.

White recalled the reactions of people in psychology to him as hesitant, since he was the only African American in many programs. People did not think that Black students had the advanced capacity to do graduate level work. He attempted to get some of his required classes waived because of his work at San Francisco State but Michigan State would not honor this request. He was well rounded and took many classes in his major at San Francisco and as a result ended up at the top of his class at Michigan State.

While his main field of study was clinical psychology, White focused a lot of his attention on aiding and supporting disadvantaged students of color in their path to acquire knowledge by developing curriculum that caters to the needs of students of color. In his quest to reform the education system, White rejects the use of white middle class norms in determining the standards of education. While at California State University, Long Beach, White helped in establishing the Educational Opportunities Program (EOP) which became a program implemented across the California State University campuses. Dr. White started the EOP program in 1967; they had 200 students in their first cohort.

In 1968, White helped found the Association of Black Psychologists along with a few other Black Psychologists during the 1968 conference of the American Psychological Association. "We cannot depend on them to define us. We have to take charge and define ourselves. We need to build our own psychology." This quote was a result of the meeting of those few Black Psychologists who saw a need for change in how psychology is applied to Blacks. During this same time, while serving as a professor and dean of undergraduate studies, White yielded to the needs of the students in helping to establish the first Black Studies Program during the 1968 strike at San Francisco State University.

White wrote on a variety of topics within the field of Black psychology. Topics included family, youth, and therapeutic counseling interventions for Black persons. In addition to his research, Joseph White was a professor who had been a practicing psychologist as well as a consultant. White had worked as a psychologist to five hospitals and three clinics in Southern California and over the years had served as a consultant for school districts, universities, private organizations, drug prevention programs, and government agencies.

=== "Toward a Black Psychology" ===
Joseph White's 1970 article "Toward a Black Psychology", published in Ebony Magazine, was a seminal document in the formation of African-American Psychology as a professional field and the rise of ethnic and cultural psychology. The article argued that whatever the future of race relations and the destiny of Black people, the creation of a Black Psychology was necessary because the psychology created by White people could never adequately apply to African-Americans. This is because White psychologists would fail to account for the lived Black experience. One example White uses in the text is the idea of White psychologists assuming a black child is under-educated based on how the child uses grammar and syntax rather than understanding the child is speaking from an African-American English dialect. White went further to point out that the application of mainstream White psychology to Black people resulted in weakness-oriented deficit finding, rather than an accurate appraisal of the situation of people of African descent.

=== Death ===
White died on 21 November 2017 from a heart attack on a plane while flying to visit his family in St. Louis, Missouri for Thanksgiving.

== Personal life ==
His first wife and mother to his three children, Lori, Lisa, and Lynn, was Myrtle Escort White. His second wife of over thirty years was Lois White.

== Awards & Legacy ==
In 1994, White was awarded a Citation of Achievement in Psychology and Community Service from President Bill Clinton. White was awarded an honorary Doctor of Laws from the University of Minnesota in 2007. Joseph White was Professor Emeritus of Psychology and Psychiatry at the University of California, Irvine where he spent most of his career. Governor Edmund G. Brown, Jr. appointed White as chairman to the California State Psychology Licensing Board where he served for three years and he was a member of the Board of Trustees of the Menninger Foundation in Topeka, Kansas. On May 23, 2008, Joseph L. White was honored as Alumnus of the year at San Francisco State University. White was also the recipient of the honorary degree Doctor of Laws from the Board of Regents of the University of Minnesota. This is the highest award given to individuals who are distinguished for their accomplishment in cultural affairs, public service or a field of knowledge and scholarship. In April 2017, White received the Lifetime Achievement Award from the California Psychological Association.

Throughout his academic career, White mentored numerous graduate students, early-career psychologists, and future leaders in multicultural psychology. This is one of the most overlooked parts of his legacy is that he mentored more than 100 doctoral students.His commitment to mentoring extended beyond traditional academic advising, as he actively encouraged students from historically underrepresented backgrounds to pursue graduate education and leadership positions within psychology. Many of his mentees later became prominent scholars, clinicians, and educators, extending his influence across multiple generations of psychologists.

== Works ==
- White, Joseph L.; Parham, Thomas A. (1990). The psychology of Blacks: an African-American perspective (2nd ed.). Englewood Cliffs, NJ: Prentice Hall. ISBN 978-0-13-733791-0.
- White, Joseph L. (1989). The troubled adolescent. Pergamon general psychology series. New York, NY: Pergamon Press. ISBN 978-0-08-036820-7.
- White, Joseph L.; Cones, James H. (1999). Black man emerging: facing the past and seizing a future in America. New York: Routledge. ISBN 978-0-415-92572-3.
- Parham, Thomas A.; White, Joseph L.; Ajamu, Adisa (2000). The psychology of Blacks: an African-centered perspective (3rd ed.). Upper Saddle River, NJ: Prentice Hall. ISBN 978-0-13-095946-1.
- Connor, Michael E.; White, Joseph L., eds. (2006). Black Fathers: An Invisible Presence in America. Routledge. ISBN 978-0-8058-4510-5.
- White, Joseph L.; Henderson, Sheila J., eds. (2008). Building multicultural competency: development, training, and practice. Lanham, MD: Rowman & Littlefield Publishers. ISBN 978-0-7425-6420-6.
