= Inez Beverly Prosser =

American psychologist

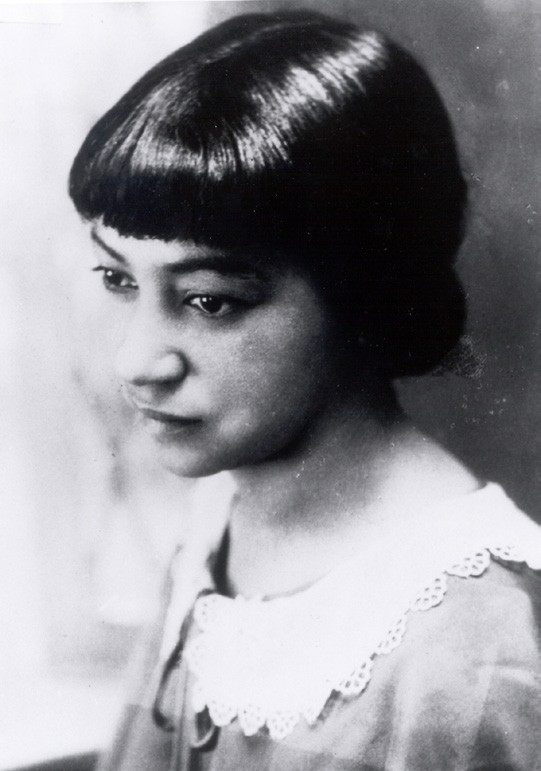
- Born: December 30, 1895; San Marcos, Texas, U.S.
- Died: September 5, 1934 (aged 38); Shreveport, Louisiana, U.S.
- Education: Ph.D in Psychology
- Alma mater: University of Cincinnati
- Occupations: Teacher and School Administrator
- Spouse: Allen Rufus Prosser (1916)
- Parents: Samuel Andrew (father); Veola Hamilton Beverly (mother)

Inez Beverly Prosser (December 30, 1895 - September 5, 1934) was a psychologist, teacher and school administrator. She is often regarded as the first African-American female to receive a Ph.D. in psychology. Her work was very influential in the hallmark Brown v. Board of Education Supreme Court ruling. After growing up in Texas, Prosser was educated at Prairie View Normal College, the University of Colorado and the University of Cincinnati. She was killed in a car accident a short time after earning her doctorate.

== Early life ==
Despite prior claims that have been made stating that Prosser was born to Samuel Andrew and Veola Hamilton Beverly in Yoakum, Texas on December 30, 1897, both the location and year of Inez's birth are not completely clear. Most published sources do list Prosser's birth year as 1895, but her transcript at the University of Colorado lists 1894; her application for a General Education Board fellowship, written by Prosser herself, lists 1896; and her death certificate lists 1895. Professionals have accepted 1895 as the most likely date. When it comes to birth location, family recollections point to Inez being born in San Marcos, Texas, a small town between Austin and San Antonio.The family was believed to not move to Yoakum until 1900. Her mother was a homemaker and her father was a waiter. Prosser was the eldest daughter and the second of eleven children.

During her youth, there were few educational opportunities for African-Americans, and her family moved many times to seek the best education they could find for their children. This fact would best explain the move to Yoakum in 1900 as that year would be the same year Inez and her older brother Leon would have started school. In 1907, Prosser and her family left Yoakum for Corpus Christi, Texas, but Inez and her brother Leon only stayed for approximately a year because Corpus Christi did not have a Black high school. Both Inez and her brother went back to Yoakum, staying with family relative until graduating Yoakum Colored School—where Prosser was valedictorian—in 1910. Prosser almost did not get her family's support to go to college. Prosser's parent felt as if they could only financially send one of their children to college, and they were planning on sending Leon. But when Prosser expressed great interest in education and Leon did not, Prosser was able to enroll for college. To contribute to the household, Prosser started a college fund to support her younger siblings' education. Of the eleven children, all graduated from high school and six went on to earn college degrees. Prosser received a degree in teacher training from Prairie View Normal College (now Prairie View A&M University), where she was also valedictorian.

== Education and career ==
She returned to Yoakum and taught for a short time at their segregated schools. Then, Prosser became an assistant principal at Clayton Industrial School in Manor, Texas, before accepting a more long-term position at Anderson High School. Throughout her time at Anderson, she taught English and coached for the spelling competitions of the Interscholastic League, an organization that sponsored events for Black high school students in athletic and academic contests throughout the state.

During this period, Prosser met and married Allen Rufus Prosser, who worked as an elevator operator at a department store in Austin, and the two were married in 1916. While working at Anderson in 1921, Prosser also began to work towards her bachelor's degree at Samuel Huston College. She completed her Bachelor of Arts degree in 1926, minoring in English and Psychology and graduating with distinction. Prosser received several awards and embraced the opportunity to continue her education. She went on to receive a master's degree in Educational Psychology from the University of Colorado. Prosser began this work in the summer of 1924, taking four undergraduate courses (two in English, one in Abnormal Psychology, and a Physical Education class) to make up for what Colorado thought she lacked in her record at Samuel Huston College. At Colorado, Prosser took several courses that were particularly relevant to her Master's thesis whose subject areas include mental tests, tests and measurement, and research methods. Her thesis, "The Comparative Reliability of Objective Tests in English Grammar", examined four kinds of English grammar tests (using the standards proposed by the National Education Association). Her four test types included true-false, multiple choice, completion, and matching questions. All tests covered the same subject areas and difficulty levels as well as comparable numbers of factual and reasoning questions. This unpublished thesis did not change the course of grammar assessment, but it motivated Prosser to further her education and appeared to ignite her interests in psychology.

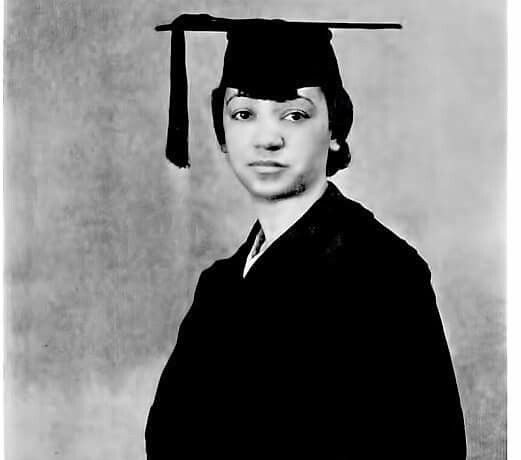
Photo of Inez Beverly Prosser in her Graduation cap and gown

Upon receiving her master's degree, Prosser left Anderson High School in 1927 to accept a position as a faculty member at Tillotson College, a Black college in Austin. Tillotson had been coeducational, but in 1926, a year before Prosser arrived, it had become a women's college. At Tillotson, she not only displayed her teaching and leadership skills but truly dedicated herself to the educational and psychological development of Black students. At Tillotson, she was given the opportunity to organize a series of lectures from 1929 to 1930, which even featured a lecture by George Washington Carver. Overall, Prosser was at Tillotson College from 1921 to 1930, serving as "Dean, Registrar and Professor of Education. Aside from the president, Prosser was second in terms of administrative authority at Tillotson. Her influences extended well beyond the classroom walls or administrative offices. Prosser was eventually transferred to another dual teaching and administrative position at Tougaloo College in Tougaloo, Mississippi. Even as Dean and Registrar of Tougaloo College, Prosser accepted the position as Principal of Tougaloo High School. Her career took an important turn when she applied for and was awarded aid from the General Education Board (established by John D. Rockefeller in 1902). In her application, she noted, "I am interested in that type of research which will lead to better teaching in elementary and high schools". She received $1,000 to apply towards another year of graduate studies. Prosser spent the 1931–1932 academic year at the University of Cincinnati in residence. Finally in 1933, she became one of the first Black women to earn a PhD in psychology, graduating from the University of Cincinnati.

Warren states that, "Prosser was mentored closely by her Doctoral adviser and developed a close friendship with them." She held positions at many schools, and not only taught, but also became assistant principal. Although racial discrimination was rampant, Prosser continued to accept minimal wages for work that rivaled or exceeded that of her white colleagues. In Prosser's case, according to Warren, "Although her dissertation research was in psychology, her doctoral mentor and other members of her committee were psychologists, and much of her coursework was in psychology, she is often denied her well-deserved title of psychologist."

Prosser returned to Tougaloo College for the 1932–1933 academic year while still working on her dissertation to work as a faculty member. Her dissertation was approved in June 1933. Dean Louis Augustus Pechstein who was the head of Prosser's Doctor of Philosophy program at the University of Cincinnati wrote to William Holmes, the president of Tougaloo College stating, "Mrs. Prosser was accepted for the degree of Doctor of Philosophy in Ed. last week . . . Mrs. Prosser developed into a first-rate graduate student, a very keen and penetrating thinker, and will in our judgment, be a fine leader in the educational work with Negro college students. I am glad to give her my special commendation for it is never an easy task for a member of her race to pursue successfully the arduous course attending se- curing the doctorate degree. This she has accomplished with dignity and credit."

== Dissertation and other works ==
Prosser arrived at the University of Cincinnati as a candidate for a PhD in Educational Psychology in 1931. She arrived at a time when there was a research program that "focused on African Americans in different school environments". The general consensus in the department at this time was that "all-black schools with black teachers could best provide the skills black students needed to survive in a society where most faced limited opportunities…segregated schools, by insulating black students from white abuse, were crucial to the formation of black identity and could become unifying community centers." Prosser's dissertation, The Non-Academic Development of Negro Children in Mixed and Segregated Schools, became an important text for issues relating to education, reform, social development, racial identity, and other prominent topics related to segregation. It was a "companion study" to Mary Crowley's 1931 dissertation, "A Comparison of the Academic Achievement of Cincinnati Negroes in Segregated and Mixed Schools" When Prosser began collecting data for her study in November 1931, Crowley was able to aid Prosser in getting the same institutions to co-operate in her research. Prosser's interest in the topic "grew out of a desire to determine objectively, so far as possible, the degree of truth in the often repeated statement that the Negro child develops superior character traits, more racial self-respect, and a greater concomitants of a well-rounded education when he is placed under the direction of Negro teachers during his formative years". She took Crowley's research a step further by considering the demographics of the student body in the schools as well. The purpose was:

(1) to measure vocational interests, leisure interests, social participation, emotional or neurotic tendencies, social distance, ascendancy-submission, overstatement, introversion-extraversion, and general personality adjustment..., (2) to ascertain the difference, if any, that exists in these traits, and (3) to determine whether one of the other of these schools is better fostering growth in personality in so far as it can be determined by the available techniques.

Unlike Crowley, Prosser explored variables she believed were personality indicators. Prosser believed that mixed school caused irreversible damage to Black children's mental health and that was the true risk behind that kind of environment. Prosser wanted to examine the difference in personality and mental health between black students in "mixed and in segregated schools". Her dissertation sought to answer seven main questions. Prosser measured the following questions by giving students surveys on personality and character traits; the first question was what are the social and cultural backgrounds of the children in the two groups? Second, what are the occupational and activity interests of the two groups? Third, to what extent do black children participate in after school activities? Fourth, what racial attitudes are each group exhibiting? Fifth, what are the emotional responses of the two groups towards being discriminated against? Sixth, what is the effect of the school type on the children's personality? Lastly, to what degree is aggressiveness and submission fostered in the two groups (1933)?

In her dissertation, Prosser argues that racial injustices and feelings of isolation have damaging effects on the psyche of Black children. The effects are even more detrimental with the standards of living as it applies to socioeconomic status. Given that her sample size was small (64 students), Prosser refrained from making absolute suggestions. She argued that school selection should be based on the student's personality, as some do well in integrated schools while others benefit from segregated schools. She believed that most Black students receive a more balanced curriculum, affection, support, and family-school consistency in segregated schools. She also noted that segregated schools not only provided job opportunities, but also "a more nurturing environment" for Black teachers as well as students. Her work was essential in proving the benefit of predominantly black school as well as HBCU's to the black psyche. In 2010, the International's Encyclopedia of Education published an article highlighting the myriad of positive benefits Black students receive in these segregated institutions. Prosser's tests concluded that Black children who went to mixed schools were more secluded, felt much more inferior at school and had trouble adjusting social, both with teachers, other students, and with family. They supported these institutions as "safe spaces" for black students to fortify their sense of self amidst the marginalization they face.

The significance of Prosser's search was that she concluded that race and racism play a role in the development of one's personality. Although Prosser planned to include a diverse range of tests and inventories to assess personality, the sample size of her study was small, with only 32 pairs of matched students. This lead some conclusions likely being a resulting of sampling error which Prosser admitted, and believed the differences were minimal but justified them nonetheless.

In 1933 and 1934, Prosser also produced seven articles in the Mississippi Educational Journal, the official newspaper of the Mississippi Association of Teachers in Colored Schools, titled “A Monthly Magazine for Teachers in Colored Schools,”. In these articles, Prosser focused on topics such as English literature, composition, grammar, and overall subjects that would help improve the teaching of English in colored schools.

== Contributions to educational psychology and her methodological approach ==
Prosser's study of child development was an important methodological contribution to educational psychology in the 1930s. Using a comparative research design instead of solely comparing academic achievement scores, she broadened our understanding of children's psychological and social experiences within different school settings on the lines of race: It was an unusually holistic attempt to understand child development for its time. During the 1930s, most education research centered on test scores and cognitive outcomes, rather than the development of positive personality traits and emotional resilience. For her research, Prosser designed a series of psychological tests to assess personality, as well as emotional responses. She administered standardized personality inventories and supplemented them with her own observations to measure how schools were affecting children's conceptions of themselves and social behavior. She used a careful matching design between pairs of students who attended segregated and integrated schools to account for factors related to socioeconomic status, family structure, and prior educational background. This careful methodological approach was especially impressive given the scarce resources Black researchers had access to on college campuses at this time.

Prosser's findings were surprising to many who had presumed that integration was always good for black students. She recorded certain psychological pressures that happened to Black children who were in integrated circumstances: they were socially ostracized by white peers, had lower self-esteem in academic situations and fewer extracurricular activities. Her studies showed that many Black children in mixed schools felt unwelcome and displayed, in what modern psychologists would recognize as, symptoms of chronic stress and social anxiety. In fact, students in segregated schools with Black teachers showed more racial identity and comfort with participating in the classroom. What distinguished Prosser's research is her concern for the importance of teacher/student relationships in children's development. She noted that Black teachers in segregated schools frequently served not just as educators but also as mentors, enablers of school achievement and sources of emotional support for students seeking to be resilient in the face of racial discrimination. These teachers knew where the children were coming from and could provide learning environments in which they felt loved and valued. Prosser contended that such psychological safety was crucial for the development of a well-integrated personality, an idea that other research in attachment theory and culturally responsive teaching may enforce. She also studied how racial attitudes developed and changed in children attending various school environments. She found that Black children who attended integrated schools were more likely to internalize negative stereotypes about their own race; those in segregated schools built strong positive racial identity. This finding was particularly significant in that it showed that educational assimilation, without concomitant social acceptance and being treated as equals, could be deleterious to the psychological development of black children. Her work foreshadowed subsequent research by psychologists including Kenneth and Mamie Clark, whose doll studies also demonstrated the impact of segregation and discrimination on Black children's self imagery.

The conceptual framework used by Prosser included elements of developmental psychology and social psychology, and aimed to analyze the way in which environmental conditions influenced personality development at critical stages. She was specifically interested in the role of belonging and interpersonal acceptance in children's psychological adjustment. In her work, she argued that educational policy was faced with the challenge of addressing not just academic measures but psychological and emotional well-being, especially for Black children confronting racist social structures. Her methodological innovations and results, however, were largely unpublished in flagship psychology journals during her lifetime. Her career was cut short due to a fatal car accident in 1934, meaning she never had the chance to develop her research program, or to dispute those who ultimately borrowed from it without acknowledgment. Recent educational psychologists strive to promote and pay tribute to the work of Prosser, who was a pioneer for using empirical research to reveal the psychological underpinnings of racial discrimination in education.

== Legacy ==
Racially segregated schools were quite a controversial topic at the time of Prosser's dissertation. The Plessy v. Ferguson "separate but equal doctrine" was the reasoning for segregation in 17 states, a majority of which were in the South and the District of Columbia. Segregated schools were also evident in the North, as attested by Cincinnati, because many Black parents wanted their children to learn from Black teachers and interact with other Black kids. Prosser understood that segregated schools provided Black children with a more comfortable environment where they would not have to worry about mistreatment and discrimination from White counterparts. Prosser was very conscious about the controversial debates on segregated schools and recognized that mandatory and voluntary segregation are two very distinct things in her dissertation. Prosser stated, "The word 'segregated' is fraught with connotations that the Negro has been taught to re- sent. This fact accounts for much of the feeling shown against the segregated school. Long accustomed to education adapted to individual as well as group needs, certain northern school systems have opened special schools for special classes. Here it seems proper to make a distinction between mandatory and voluntary segregation. As generally understood, mandatory segregation has as its expressed purpose the isolation of an un-desirable element in the population; on the contrary, special schools based on voluntary segregation have as their expressed purpose fitting education to the needs of the group under consideration."

Prosser was one of the key figures in the debate on how to best educate Black students. Arguments made in her dissertation were used in the 1920s and 1930s in the debate about school segregation. Her dissertation "examined personality differences in black children attending either voluntarily segregated or integrated schools and concluded that black children were better served in segregated schools" As a Black female psychologist, Prosser's voice was crucial during her time and now because the voices and this histories of Black Psychology and Black Psychologist has been absent from the narratives of mainstream American psychology. Although her dissertation research remains unpublished, her work appropriated by other researchers were used in the debated leading up to the Brown v. Board of Education U.S. Supreme Court ruling of 1954, which argues that segregated schools were inherently unequal, thereby mandating integration in the nations public schools. Her works on the educational and identity development of Black students were not only influenced by her teaching and administrative experience, but by her only experiences at a "colored" school in Texas.

While Prosser is frequently referred to as the first African-American woman to earn a PhD in psychology, others believe that Ruth Winifred Howard (1900–1997) was the first. Those who argue that Howard, earning PhD at the University of Minnesota in 1934, is the first African-American woman to earn a PhD, hold the view that a psychologist is someone who earned the degree within a psychology department.

Prosser posed a powerful argument regarding the effects of racial inequality on the mental health of African-American children. In her dissertation, she discussed optional education avenues, exploring reasons for providing children the opportunity to be educated according to their ability, not their socioeconomic status. She cited examples of psychological stress in students incurred as a result of racial discrepancies and racial isolation. Prosser voiced her support for segregated schools and the reasons they benefited students and staff, and also provided reasons for which this segregation was detrimental to all students and individuals involved. Many were not in support of segregated schools due to the fact that educational institutions were microcosms of the racist society that existed outside the walls of school. Though the topic was highly debated, The Association of Afro-American Educators displayed continued support for segregated schools in decades to come. Like Prosser, they concur that if resources are properly allocated, the benefits of segregated schools are tremendous to the black child psyche. During the debates over school segregation in the 1920s, many of her arguments were cited. She was a critical voice for the African-American community at a time when women academics were scarce. Prosser's contributions to the improvement of education for all students can be felt in many policies still being used throughout the teaching community today.

Prosser also lives on through the education she provided to her younger siblings. Prosser acknowledged that she would pay for the higher education of her siblings, allowing five of them to earn college degrees with Prosser's help. Prosser guided her siblings by giving them money, books, and aiding them on what courses they should consider taking. Prosser was described as wanting the best for her siblings, and for being supportive but not controlling.

== Death ==
Prosser spent her year in 1934 actively improving training for teachers who worked in Mississippi's black schools; Prosser planned a summer program for the teachers at Jackson College, and would often guide workshops in programs for teachers.

After finishing the Jackson summer school program, On August 28, Prosser, her husband, and her sister Katharine Beverly were coming back to Mississippi after visiting family in Texas when they were involved in a head-on collision near Shreveport, Louisiana. Prosser's brother Rufus was the driver in the car, and all three individuals were injured. In this accident, Prosser was ejected through the windshield and out of all three passengers, she was the most seriously injured.

After the accident, Prosser was transported to the Tri-State Sanitarium in Shreveport where she died on September 5, 1934. Prosser was brought to San Antonio, Texas, which is where her parents resided, for a burial and funeral service on September 8, 1934. Prosser also had a memorial service held in her honor at Tougaloo College on October 14, 1934. Prosser headstone resides in Southern Memorial Park in San Antonio where her headstone reads, "How many hopes lie buried here."

== Honors ==
- 1968 San Antonio, Texas at the HemisFair exposition she was cited for her contribution to Texas culture.
- Rockefeller Foundation General Education Board Fellowship
- Appeared on the cover of The Crisis in August 1933, official magazine of the National Association for the Advancement of Colored People.

== Affiliations ==
- Alpha Kappa Alpha sorority
- African Methodist Episcopal Church

== Selected works ==
- "The Non-Academic Development of Negro Children in Mixed and Segregated Schools"
