= Faye Z. Belgrave =

American psychologist

- Occupation: Professor of Psychology
- Awards: 2018 APA Psychology and AIDS Distinguished Leadership Award

Academic background
- Education: North Carolina Agricultural and Technical State University

Faye Z. Belgrave is a psychologist who researches substance abuse and HIV among African American youth. She is currently a professor of psychology and the founding director of the Center for Cultural Experiences in Prevention (CCEP) at Virginia Commonwealth University (VCU). She became a professor at Virginia Commonwealth University in 1997.

Belgrave received awards and acknowledgement for her research including the 2018 Psychology and AIDS Distinguished Leadership Award from the American Psychological Association.

== Education ==
Belgrave received her Bachelor of Science from North Carolina Agricultural and Technical State University and her Ph.D. from the University of Maryland, College Park in 1982.
