= Journal of Black Psychology =

- Discipline: Psychology
- Language: English
- Edited by: Beverly J. Vandiver

Publication details
- History: 1974–present
- Publisher: SAGE Publications on behalf of the Association of Black Psychologists (United States)
- Frequency: 8/year
- Impact factor: 2.608 (2021)

Standard abbreviations
- ISO 4: J. Black Psychol.

Indexing
- ISSN: 0095-7984 (print); 1552-4558 (web)
- LCCN: 75641218
- OCLC no.: 264945151

Links
- Journal homepage; Online access; Online archive

The Journal of Black Psychology is a quarterly peer-reviewed academic journal published by SAGE Publications on behalf of the Association of Black Psychologists. The journal covers all aspects of the psychological study of Black populations. It was established in 1974 and its editor-in-chief is Beverly J. Vandiver (Western Michigan University).

== Abstracting and indexing ==
The journal is abstracted and indexed in the Social Sciences Citation Index, Academic Search Premier, Education Resources Information Center, and PsycINFO. According to the Journal Citation Reports, the journal has a 2021 impact factor of 2.608.
