= Association of Black Psychologists =

American professional organization

- Formation: 1968
- Type: NGO
- Headquarters: Washington, D.C.
- Location: United States
- Website: abpsi.org

The Association of Black Psychologists (ABPsi) is a professional association of African American psychologists founded in 1968 in San Francisco, with regional chapters throughout the United States. It publishes the Journal of Black Psychology. Its main offices are in Washington, D.C. The focuses of the ABPsi are to address the needs of black psychologists while also seeking to improve the state of black mental health at large.

== Beginnings ==
The ABPsi was formed in the wake of the assassination of Martin Luther King Jr. and the rise of Black Nationalism of that era. The ABPsi intended to create a psychology of the black experience focused on improving the circumstances of black people. Their initial purpose was to help black psychologists in a time of discrimination and to provide psychological resources to the larger black community. The founding psychologists believed that a psychology created mostly by white middle-class men could not explain the situation of people of African descent, and moved to incorporate African philosophy and cultural experience into the creation of a new understanding of black psychology.

The principles of ABPsi's creation were "to organize their skills and abilities to influence necessary change, and to address themselves to significant social problems affecting the Black community and other segments of the population whose needs society has not fulfilled." The founders actively chose to remain independent of the American Psychological Association (APA), decrying that body's complicit role in perpetuating white racism in society and the prevalence of studies featuring only white male participants. Instead, the ABPsi took a more active stance, seeking “to develop a nationwide structure for pooling their resources in meeting the challenge of racism and poverty” according to a statement released at their founding in 1968. Ebony Magazine's publication of "Toward a Black Psychology" by Joseph White in 1970 was a landmark in setting the tone and direction of the emerging field of Black Psychology. By 1974 the ABPsi had established offices in Washington, D.C., begun the Journal of Black Psychology, and fully separated from the APA. In 1976 Ruth G. King became the first female president of the ABPsi.

== Work ==
The ABPsi successfully anchored the formation of an independent field of Black Psychology. With increased numbers of African-Americans enrolling in graduate programs in Psychology and entering the field, the ABPsi's Journal, newsletter, and annual meetings brought the individual efforts of African-American psychologists together to form a collective endeavor encompassing a large body of research including hundreds of books and thousands of articles. The ABPsi has continued to orient itself toward actively addressing the problems facing black communities and challenging myths of black inferiority that persist in mainstream psychology. The ABPsi aided in the formation of many other associations of Black professionals, joining in an inter-disciplinary effort to further the struggles of African-Americans. While the ABPsi has achieved greater recognition within mainstream psychology, the critiques levied by its founders can be clearly seen in the ascendant field of cultural psychology. Within the past few years, the ABPsi has been able to launch programs to certify specialists in the practice of "African-centered psychology". Through these programs, practitioners are trained to tend to the specific needs of those of African ancestry.

== Past presidents ==
Past presidents of the Association of Black Psychologists include the following:

- Charles W. Thomas, Ph.D. (1968–1969)
- Robert Green, Ph.D. (1968–1969)
- Henry Tomes, Ph.D. (1969–1970)
- Robert L. Williams, Ph.D. (1969–1970)
- Stanley Crockett, Ph.D. (1970–1971)
- Reginald L. Jones, Ph.D. (1971–1972)
- James S. Jackson, Ph.D. (1972–1973)
- Thomas O. Hilliard, Ph.D.(1973–1974)
- George D. Jackson, Ph.D. (1974–1975)
- William Hayes, Ph.D. (1975–1976)
- Ruth E.G. King, Ed.D (1976–1977)
- Maisha Bennett, Ph.D. (1978–1979)
- Joseph Awkard, Ph.D. (1979–1980)
- Daniel Williams, Ph.D. (1980–1981)
- David Terrell, Ph.D. (1981–1982)
- Joseph A. Baldwin, Ph.D. (1982–1983)
- William K. Lyles, Ph.D. (1983–1984)
- W. Monty Whitney, Ph.D. (1984–1985)
- Melvin Rogers, Ph.D. (1985–1986)
- Halford Fairchild, Ph.D. (1986–1987)
- Na'im Akbar, Ph.D. (1987–1988)
- Dennis E. Chestnut, Ph.D. (1988–1989)
- Suzanne Randolph, Ph.D.(1989–1990)
- Linda James Myers, Ph.D. (1990–1991)
- Timothy R. Moragne, Psy.D. (1991–1992)
- Maisha Hamilton Bennett, Ph.D. (1992–1993)
- Anna M. Jackson, Ph.D. (1993–1994)
- Wade Nobles, Ph.D. (1994–1995)
- Thomas A. Parham, Ph.D. (1995–1996)
- Frederick B. Phillips, Psy.D. (1996–1997)
- Kamau Dana Dennard, Ph.D. (1997–1998)
- Afi Samella Abdullah, Ph.D. (1998–1999)
- Mawiya Kambon, Ph.D. (1999–2000)
- Anthony Young, Ph.D.(2000–2001)
- Mary E. Hargrow, Ph.D. (2001–2002)
- Harvette Grey, Ph.D. (2002–2003)
- Willie S. Williams, Ph.D. (2003–2004)
- James E. Savage, Ph.D. (2004–2005)
- Robert Atwell, Psy.D. (2005–2007)
- Dorothy A. Holmes, Ph.D. (2007–2009)
- Benson George Cooke, Ed.D. (2009-2011)
- Cheryl Tawede Grills, Ph.D. (2011-2013)
- Taasogle Daryl Rowe, Ph.D. (2013-2015)
- Kevin Washington, Ph.D. (2015-2017)
- Huberta Jackson-Lowman, Ph.D. (2017–2019)
- Theopia Jackson, Ph.D, (2019–2021)
- Donell Barnett, Ph.D,(2021-2023)
- Dr. Sharon L. Bethea, Ph.D,(2023 -2025)
- Monique Swift, PsyD Current President (2025-2027)
