= Francis Sumner =

American psychologist (1895–1954)

- Born: Francis Cecil Sumner; December 7, 1895; Pine Bluff, Arkansas, U.S.
- Died: January 11, 1954 (aged 58); Washington, D.C., U.S.
- Resting place: Arlington National Cemetery
- Education: Lincoln University BS, BA; Clark University PhD
- Known for: Psychoanalysis
- Spouses: Francees H. Hughston (m. 1922, divorced); Nettie M. Broker (m. 1946)
- Scientific career
- Workplaces: Howard University; Wilberforce University; Southern University; West Virginia Collegiate Institute
- Thesis: Psychoanalysis of Freud and Adler
- Doctoral students: Kenneth Bancroft Clark

Francis Cecil Sumner (December 7, 1895 – January 11, 1954) was an American leader in education reform. He is commonly referred to as the "Father of Black Psychology." He is primarily known for being the first African American to receive a Ph.D. in psychology (in 1920). He worked closely with G. Stanley Hall during his time at Clark University, and his dissertation—published in Pedagogical Seminary, which later became the Journal of Genetic Psychology—focused on "Psychoanalysis of Freud and Adler."

== Early life and education ==
Francis Cecil Sumner was born in Pine Bluff, Arkansas, on December 7, 1895. He was the second son of David Alexander and Ellen Lillian Sumner and younger brother to Eugene Sumner. Sumner attended elementary schools in Norfolk, Virginia, and Plainfield, New Jersey. His parents were concerned about the poor quality of educational opportunities for African Americans, so they worked particularly hard to provide Francis with books and other materials and they encouraged him to educate himself as they had done. They developed his assignments and supervised his progress. Sumner never received a formal post primary education. Sumner's applications to schools would read "private instruction in secondary subjects by father". With no high school diploma, Sumner was required to take an examination to see if he was suitable to be admitted to Lincoln College (now Lincoln University), in Chester County, Pennsylvania, the first institution dedicated to and primarily for African Americans in the United States. Sumner passed the test and, in 1911, at the age of 15, was admitted.

=== Formal education ===
Sumner graduated as valedictorian from Lincoln College, magnum cum laude in philosophy with special honors in English, Modern Languages and Greek, studying also Latin and philosophy, in 1915. Sumner then went to Clark University in 1916 and in the fall he received his second bachelor's degree in English. There, he developed a mentor-mentee relationship with the president of Clark, G. Stanley Hall. Sumner also developed a relationship with James P. Porter, the dean of Clark University and professor of psychology. Hall and Sumner's relationship became one of mutual respect as Hall continued to provide encouragement to Sumner and many other African-American students. Sumner graduated from Clark University in 1916 with a B.A degree in English.

Sumner returned to Lincoln University as a graduate student and as a teacher of religious study, psychology, philosophy, and German. It was at this time that Sumner began to consider advancing his study in psychology. Sumner kept in contact with Hall, asking for assistance and consideration for a fellowship award to study "race psychology" at Clark University. This later became his area of focus as he worked toward "the understanding and elimination of racial bias in the administration of justice."

In 1917, Sumner returned to Clark University, where he was awarded a senior scholarship. Hall approved his application for a Ph.D. in psychology. His education was postponed in 1918 when he was drafted by the United States Military He was sent to Camp Meade Maryland for basic training with the 48th Company, 154 Depot Brigade. Sumner was sent to the battlefield in Germany and in his time there, he kept contact with his mentor, G. Stanley Hall. Sumner asked to be reconsidered as a candidate upon his return. Sumner remained in France until he was discharged in the middle of 1919. After his doctoral dissertation entitled "Psychoanalysis of Freud and Adler" was accepted he received his doctorate degree from Clark University on June 14, 1920, making him the first African-American to receive a Ph.D. in psychology.

== Career ==
Sumner's area of focus was in investigating how to refute racism and bias in the theories used to conclude the inferiority of African Americans. Sumner's work is thought to be a response to the Eurocentric methods of psychology.

Sumner accepted a professor position at Wilberforce University in 1920. While at Wilberforce, Sumner was a professor of psychology and philosophy. In 1921 he went to teach at Southern University in Louisiana, a HBCU. In fall 1921, he accepted a position at West Virginia Collegiate Institute, where he wrote many articles dealing with the state of colleges and acceptance of African-Americans or the lack thereof. Sumner used these articles to support and raise awareness for the views brought up by Booker T. Washington and W.E.B. Dubois. He remained for the next 7 years. Over time, he failed to receive funding for his research. He claimed that race prejudice was the cause of his inability to attain his and other African American scientists' funding. In his time at these universities he faced financial difficulty, because white research agencies refused to provide funding for him.

From 1928 until his death in 1954, Sumner served as the chair of the psychology department at Howard University. Sumner is credited, along with Max Meenes and Frederick P. Watts, with helping develop the psychology department at Howard University. He also is known for teaching social psychologist Kenneth B. Clark, an influential figure in the civil rights movement. Sumner encouraged that psychology should move away from philosophy and the school of education.

Sumner resigned from West Virginia Collegiate Institute on August 31, 1928. He then moved on to Howard University in fall 1928, and became the acting chairman and professor, until 1930 upon which time he became the fully appointed chair of Psychology and succeeded in making the department independent from Philosophy. Sumner held the position until he died on January 12, 1954.

In an attempt to show support and praise for the excellence of his students, Sumner created an incentive program. This award was given to one of his psychology students who submitted the best essay on a specific theme. One recipient of this award was Kenneth Bancroft Clark, who was later to become the first African American president of the APA.

Sumner had at least 45 publications throughout his career. His interest in applied psychology led to multiple publications on color and vision. Sumner's primary focus was in the psychology of religion. He gave a paper to the International Congress of Religious Psychology (Vienna). The paper was on "The Mental Hygiene of Religion." Sumner was one of the first academics to contribute to the fields of psychology, religion, and the administration of justice.

Another of Sumner's notable achievements was his work with the Journal of Social Psychology and the Psychological Bulletin. For years he was the official abstractor for both journals. He began writing the abstracts in 1946, and between 1948 and 1949 he wrote 505 abstracts. Sumner wrote over 2,000 abstracts during his time with these two journals. Most of the abstracts he wrote were from French and German authors, others were Russian, Spanish, and English.

Sumner was described as motivating and encouraging (Bayton, 1975). Kenneth Clark once stated, "And he didn't just teach psychology. He taught integrity. And, although he led the way for other Blacks in psychology, Sumner would permit no nonsense about there being anything like "Black Psychology" -any more than he would have allowed any nonsense about "Black astronomy." In this and many other ways, Sumner was a model for me. In fact, he has always been my standard when I evaluate myself."

=== Awards ===
Sumner was a member of many associations, including the American Psychological Association, American Association for the Advancement of Science, American Educational Research Association, Eastern Psychological Association, Southern Society for Philosophy and Psychology, and the District of Columbia Psychological Association. He was a member of fraternal organizations, including Psi Chi, Pi Gamma Mu, and Kappa Alpha Psi, writing several journal articles for the latter fraternity.

=== Publications ===
- Psychoanalysis of Freud and Adler (1922)

== Race, discrimination, and SSPP membership ==
Throughout his life and career, Sumner battled racism and discrimination. Sumner was a pioneer in the field of race psychology who laid the framework for future research on the topic, contradicting many psychologists' ideas on race. Sumner's study included a wide range of themes, including the variations in mental health between white and black people, and African-American perspectives of the judicial system. In 1939, Sumner applied for a membership in the Southern Society for Philosophy and Psychology (SSPP), having the requisite endorsement of two current members as well as an active membership in the American Psychological Association (APA). Upon receiving his application, the SSPP council amended its constitution to block Sumner's path to membership. Many members objected and threatened to resign if Sumner was denied. After Sumner's application was approved, members provided alternate explanations for why Sumner's application was delayed. One explanation blamed the secretaries. Records showed that there was concern that additional African-American applicants would follow if Sumner were to be admitted. The SSPP today is in favor of admitting African American members.

== View on "Negro Education" ==
Sumner's scientific record was outstanding, but it was through his efforts to build and promote better education for African-Americans that he made the most significant impact. Sumner was a staunch supporter of African-American education. He advocated for more funding for African-American schools and teachers, and he taught at Howard University for over thirty years. In 1926, Sumner viewed the African American culture as younger as it was only a few hundred years removed from savagery and less than a century from slavery, while those of Whites was more a pinnacle of Western Civilization. With that in mind, he felt that many inadequacies existed between the teaching methods of African Americans. Sharing the same stance as Booker T. Washington of the Tuskegee Institute in Alabama, Sumner emphasized the need for education to be customized for African education.

His goal was to culturally elevate the African Americans and stressed the importance of learning trades such as carpentry and plumbing. Sumner also endorsed the beliefs of another African American social scientist, G.V. Cools, on the importance of building character in the education of African-American youth. White historians were charged for being biased with "negligence in omitting significant portions of Black history from their writings. Sumner mentioned that the Negro race cannot be denied that it has produced individuals whose cultural status plainly warrants a higher education. He concluded that for those very few Black youths ready for a liberalized education, it'd be best to work out in institutions preferably for Negroes in the so-called Negro colleges or universities. Sumner's views on "Negro Education" grew attention and criticism from individuals and organizations like the National Association for the Advancement of Colored People (NAACP) who were concerned that Sumner was advocating for perpetually segregated education systems.

== Personal life and death ==
Sumner married Francees H. Hughston in 1922, the marriage ended in divorce. He then married Nettie M. Broker in 1946. He had no children. Sumner died of a heart attack while shoveling snow outside his home in Washington, D.C., on January 11, 1954. He received a military honor guard in memory for his service during World War I. Sumner was buried at Arlington National Cemetery in Virginia. Many students described Sumner as a "low key and very dedicated"; as a very quiet and very unassuming individual who was "brilliant with tremendous capacity to make an analysis of an individual's gestalt" and as "Howard's most stimulating scholar."
