= Adelbert =

- Gender: Male
- Language: German

Origin
- Meaning: noble bright

Other names
- See also: Albert, Adalbert, Delbert

Adelbert is a given name of German origin, which means "noble bright" or "noble shining", derived from the words adal (meaning noble) and berht (shining or bright). Alternative spellings include Adalbart and Adalberto. Related names include Albert, Delbert, and Elbert. The name Adelbert may refer to:

- Adelbert Althouse (1869–1954), American politician
- Adelbert Ames (1835–1933), American politician
- Adelbert Ames Jr. (1880–1955), American scientist
- Adelbert Anson (1840–1909), English-born Canadian clergyman
- Adelbert S. Atherton (1850–1920), American politician
- Adelbert Bleekman (1846–1908), American politician
- Adelbert Brownlow-Cust, 3rd Earl Brownlow (1844–1921), British soldier, courtier and Conservative politician
- Adelbert Bryan (fl. 1980s–2000s), U.S. Virgin Islands politician
- Adelbert Rinaldo Buffington (1837–1922), United States Army Brigadier General
- Adelbert Cronkhite (1861–1937), career United States Army officer
- Adelbert Delbrück (1822–1890), German banker
- Adelbert Heinrich Graf von Baudissin (1820–1871), German writer
- Adelbert Edward Hanna (1863–1918), Canadian politician
- Adelbert Everson (1841–1913), American Civil War soldier
- Adelbert Ford (1890–1976), American psychologist
- Adelbert Jenkins (fl. 1960s–2000s), African American clinical psychologistknown for his humanistic approach to Black psychology
- Adelbert J. McCormick (1845–1903), American merchant and politician
- Adelbert Mühlschlegel (1897–1980), prominent German Baháʼí
- Adelbert Niemeyer (1867–1932), German painter
- Adelbert Nongrum (fl. 2010s–2020s), Indian politician
- Adelbert H. Roberts (1866–1937), first African-American to serve in the Illinois Senate
- Adelbert Schulz (1903–1944), German general
- Adelbert St. John (1931–2009), Canadian-Austrian professional ice hockey player
- Adelbert Delos Thorp (1844–1919), American farmer, fisherman, and Wisconsin pioneer
- Adelbert L. Utt (1856–1936), American politician
- Adelbert Van de Walle (1922–2006), Belgian architect and art historian
- Adelbert von Chamisso (1781–1838), German writer
- Adelbert von Keller (1812–1883), German scholar
- Adelbert Waldron (1933–1995), United States Army sniper
- Adelbert Theodor Wangemann (1855–1906), German-born American laboratory assistant to Thomas Edison

== See also ==
- Adalbert, a given name
- Adalberto, a given name
- Aldebert (disambiguation)
- Arthur Adelbert Taylor (1849–1923) American newspaper editor and publisher
