= Delbert =

Delbert is a given name. It is a short form of Adelbert, which is a combination of the German words adal, meaning noble, and berht, meaning bright. Notable people with the name include:

- Delbert F. Anderson (1919–1999), American farmer and politician
- Delbert Baker, Seventh-day Adventist minister, author, educator, and administrator
- Delbert Black (1922–2000), the first Master Chief Petty Officer of the Navy, from 1967 to 1971
- Delbert Cowsette (born 1977), former American football defensive tackle in the National Football League
- Delbert Daisey (1924–2017), known as Cigar Daisey, American waterfowl wood carver
- Delbert Day, American engineer and co-inventor of TheraSphere glass microspheres and glasphalt
- Delbert Fowler (born 1958), former American football player for the Winnipeg Blue Bombers of the Canadian Football League
- D. R. Fulkerson (1924–1976), mathematician who co-developed the Ford–Fulkerson algorithm
- Delbert Gee, judge of the Superior Court of California (USA) in Alameda County since 2002
- Delbert W. Halsey (1919–1942), United States Navy officer, received the Navy Cross posthumously for actions in World War II
- Delbert Hosemann (born 1947), the Republican Secretary of State of Mississippi
- Delbert O. Jennings (1936–2003), United States Army soldier, recipient of the Medal of Honor for actions in the Vietnam War
- Delbert Kirsch, Canadian provincial politician
- Delbert Lamb (1914–2010), American speed skater who competed in the 1936 Winter Olympics and in the 1948 Winter Olympics
- Del Latta (1920–2016), former member of the United States House of Representatives
- Delbert Mann (1920–2007), American television and film director
- Delbert McClinton (born 1940), American blues rock and electric blues singer-songwriter, guitarist, harmonica player and pianist
- Delbert Miller, member of the Wisconsin State Assembly
- G. Delbert Morris (1909–1987), United States Republican politician who served in the California legislature
- Delbert Paris, Dominican politician
- Delbert Philpott (1923–2005), American soldier and scientist
- Delbert Riley, Canadian First Nations leader of Chippewa background
- Delbert Lee Scott (born 1949), businessman and politician from Missouri
- Delbert Spurlock (born 1941), US Assistant Secretary of the Army (1980–1989), Deputy Secretary of Labor (1991–1993)
- Delbert L. Stapley (1896–1978), member of the Quorum of the Twelve Apostles in The Church of Jesus Christ of Latter-day Saints (1950–1978)
- Del Thiessen, American psychology professor emeritus
- Del Thompson (born 1958), American football player
- Delbert Tibbs (1939–2013), American man wrongfully convicted of murder and rape in 1974 and sentenced to death
- Delbert Leroy True (1923–2001), archaeologist who worked in California, particularly San Diego County, and in northern Chile
- Del Webb (1899–1974), American real estate developer and a co-owner of the New York Yankees baseball club
- Delbert E. Wong (1920–2006), the first Chinese American judge in the continental United States
- Del Yocam (born 1943), American technology executive

== See also ==
- USS Delbert W. Halsey (DE-310), United States Navy Evarts-class destroyer escort launched during World War II but never completed
- Delbert and Ora Chipman House on E. Main St. in American Fork, Utah, built c. 1870s
- Delbert W. Meier House, modest houses designed by architect Frank Lloyd Wright
- Debert
- Dehl Berti
- Dilbert (disambiguation)
- Elbert (disambiguation)
- Gondelbert
- Wandelbert
