= Adalbert =

- Gender: Male
- Language: German

Origin
- Meaning: noble bright

Other names
- See also: Adalberto, Albert, Adelbert, Adalberht, Adalbrecht, Albrecht, Elbert, Alberto

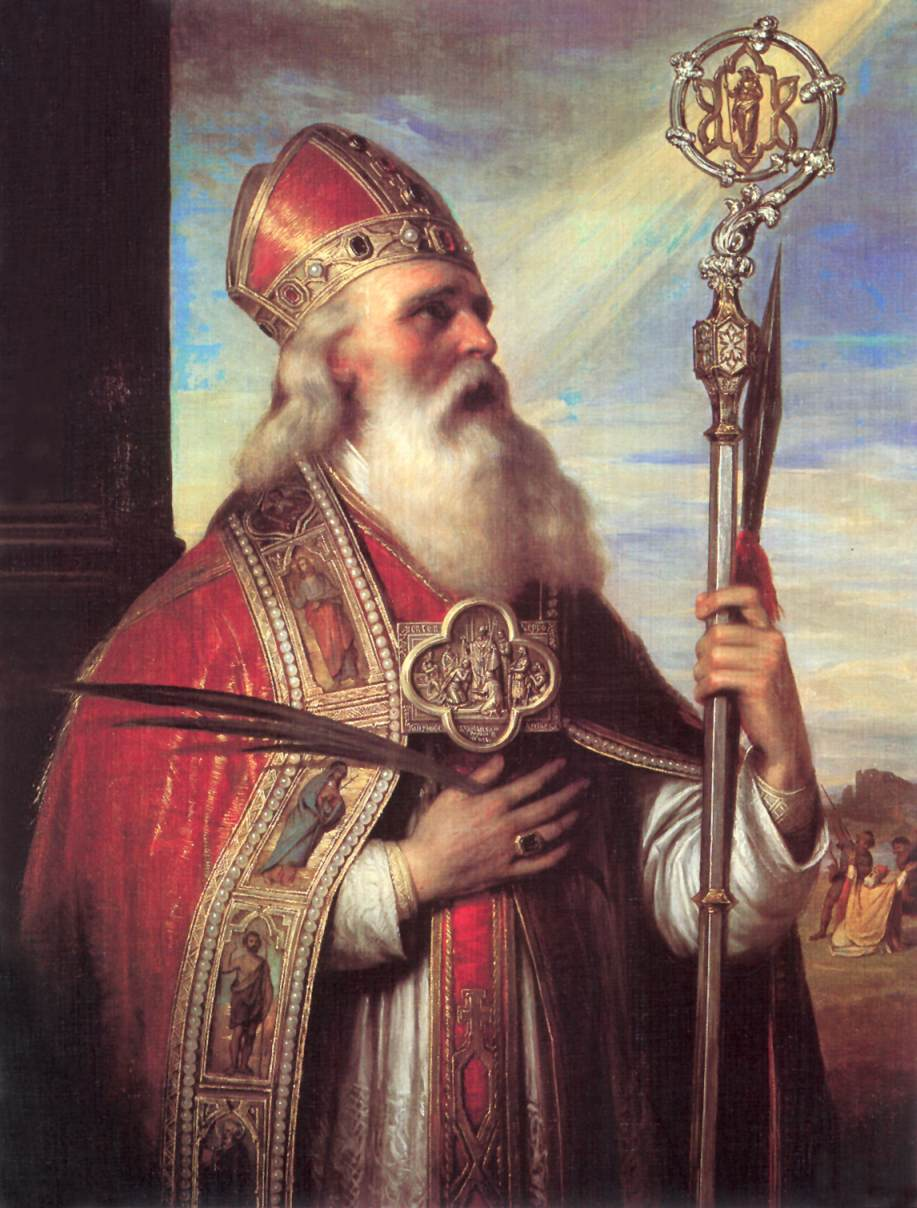
Adalbert of Prague by Mihály Kovács.

Adalbert is a German given name which means "noble bright" or "noble shining", derived from the words adal (meaning noble) and berht (shining or bright). Alternative spellings include Adelbart, Adelbert and Adalberto. Derivative names include Albert and Elbert.

Because St Adalbert of Prague (†997), early mediaeval missionary who became Czech, Polish and Hungarian patron saint, at his confirmation changed his name from native Vojtěch to Adalbert, this Germanic name has been artificially assigned to Slavonic Vojtěch/Wojciech ("he who is happy in battle") and via the same process have been the names Vojtěch and Adalbert connected with Hungarian name Béla (maybe "inner part") – so, in Central European settings these three names are taken as the equivalents, although they have no linguistic connection to each other.

== Given name ==
- Adalbert Begas (1836–1888), German painter
- Adalbert Baumann (1870–1943), Bavarian teacher
- Adalbert Czerny (1863–1941), Austrian pediatrician
- Adalbert Deșu (1909–1937), Romanian football player
- Adalbert Falk (1827–1900), German politician
- Adalbert Gyrowetz (1763–1850), Czech composer; born Vojtěch Matyáš Jírovec
- Adalbert Kraus (born 1937), German singer
- Adalbert Krüger (1832–1896), German astronomer
- Adalbert László Arany (1909–1967), Slovak Hungarian linguist
- Adalbert Pilch (1917–2004), Austrian artist
- Adalbert Schnizlein (1814–1868), German botanist
- Adalbert Stifter (1805–1868), Austrian writer
- Adalbert von Blanc (1907–1976), German admiral
- Adalbert von Ladenberg (1798–1855), Prussian politician
- Adalbert Zafirov (born 1969), Bulgarian football player
- Aldebert, also called Adalbert, (8th century) Gallic preacher

=== Royal and religious leaders ===
- Adalbert I of Ostrevent (died 652), abbot of Marchiennes
- Adalbert, Duke of Alsace (died 723)
- Adalbert of Egmond (died 710), Northumbrian missionary
- Adalbert I of Tuscany (820–886)
- Adalbert II of Tuscany (875–915)
- Adalbert (bishop of Passau) (died 970)
- Adalbert of Magdeburg (910–981), Archbishop of Magdeburg
- Adalbert of Italy (936–971), Margrave of Ivrea
- Adalbert of Prague (956–997), Bohemian missionary and saint, Bishop of Prague; born Vojtěch Slavnikid
- Adalbert, Margrave of Austria (985–1055)
- Adalbert, Duke of Lorraine (1000–1048)
- Adalbert of Hamburg-Bremen (1000–1072), Archbishop of Hamburg
- Adalbert (bishop of Orkney) (fl. 1043 x 1072), prelate
- Adalbert II, Count of Ballenstedt (1030–1083)
- Adalbert of Mainz (died 1137), Archbishop of Mainz
- Adalbert of Pomerania (1124–1162), Pomeranian bishop
- Adalbert III of Bohemia (1145–1200), Archbishop of Salzburg, born Vojtěch Přemyslid
- Adalbert of Saxony (1467–1484), Archbishop of Mainz
- Adalbert of Prussia (1811–1873), German prince
- Adalbert of Bavaria (1828–1875), German prince

== Surname ==
- Max Adalbert (1874–1933), German actor

== See also ==
- Adelbert
- Adalberto
- Saint-Adalbert
- Vojtěch
- Béla (given name)
