= Elbert =

Elbert is a name that derived from the Germanic Alibert and may refer to:

== People ==
=== Given name ===
- Elbert Andrews (1901–1979), American baseball player
- Elbert Dysart Botts (1893–1962), American engineer
- Elbert Adrain Brinckerhoff (1838–1913), American merchant and mayor
- Elbert Caraway (1905–1975), American football and baseball player and coach
- Elbert Frank Cox (1895–1969), American mathematician
- Elbert Crawford (1966–2013), American football player
- Elbert Dijkgraaf (born 1970), Dutch economist and politician
- Elbert Allen Drummond (1943–2012), American heir, businessman and philanthropist
- Elbert Drungo (1943–2014), American football offensive lineman
- Elbert Dubenion (1933–2019), American football flanker
- Elbert Eatmon (1914–1998), American professional baseball pitcher
- Elbert H. English (1816–1884), associate justice of the Arkansas Supreme Court
- Elbert Floyd-Jones (1817–1901), American politician
- Elbert Foules (born 1961), American football cornerback
- Elbert Gill (1931–2014), American chiropractor and politician
- Elbert Glover (born 1945), American researcher and author in the field of tobacco addiction and smoking cessation
- Elbert Guillory (born 1944), Louisiana politician
- Elbert Bertram Haltom Jr. (1922–2003), judge of the United States District Court for the Northern District of Alabama
- Elbert de Hochepied (1706–1763), Dutch politician and diplomat
- Elbert Hubbard (1856–1915), American writer, publisher, artist, and philosopher
- Elbert H. Hubbard (1849–1912), United States congressman
- Elbert de Leeuw (1519/20–1598), Dutch jurist and statesman better known as Elbertus Leoninus
- Elbert G. Mathews (1910–1977), American diplomat
- Elbert H. Parsons (1907–1968), Mississippi judge and namesake of the Elbert H. Parsons Law Library
- Elbert Peets (1886–1968), American landscape architect, city planner
- Elbert Roest (born 1954), Dutch politician and historian
- Elbert Root (1915–1983), American Olympic diver
- Elbert A. Smith (1871–1959), American Latter Day Saints leader
- Elbert B. Smith (1921–2013), American historian and author
- Elbert H. Smith (fl. 1839), American poet
- Elbert S. Smith (1911–1983), American politician
- Elbert D. Thomas (1883–1953), United States Senator for Utah
- Elbert Lee Trinkle (1876–1939), American Governor of Virginia
- Elbert Tuttle (1897–1996), American judge
- Elbert B. Watson (1879–1963), American architect
- Elbert Weinberg (1928–1991), American sculptor
- Elbert West (1967–2015), American country singer-songwriter
- Elbert Williams (1908–1940), African-American civil rights leader
- Elbert A. Woodward (1836–1905), American fraudster

=== Surname ===
- Andor Elbert (1934–2014), Hungarian-born Canadian sprint canoer
- Donnie Elbert (1936–1989), American soul singer and songwriter
- Emily Elbert (born 1988), American singer-songwriter and guitarist
- Samuel Elbert (1740–1788), American merchant, revolutionary soldier, and politician
- Samuel Hitt Elbert (1833–1899), American governor and chief justice of Colorado
- Samuel Hoyt Elbert (1907–1997), American linguist

== Places in the United States ==
- Elbert, Colorado, named for Samuel Elbert (1833–1899)
- Elbert County, Colorado, named for Samuel Elbert (1833–1899)
- Elbert County, Georgia, named for Samuel Elbert (1740–1788)
- Elbert, Texas
- Elbert, West Virginia
- Lake Elbert, Florida
- Mount Elbert, the highest mountain in the Rocky Mountains; named for Samuel Elbert (1833–1899)

== Other ==
- Elbert meteorite, a meteorite which fell in Colorado in 1998

== See also ==
- Egbert B. Brown (1816–1902), American Civil War Union general
