= Aldebert de Chambrun =

Aldebert de Chambrun may refer to:

- Aldebert de Chambrun (1821–1899), French politician
- Aldebert de Chambrun (1872–1962), French general

== See also ==
- Aldebert (disambiguation)
