= Ename =

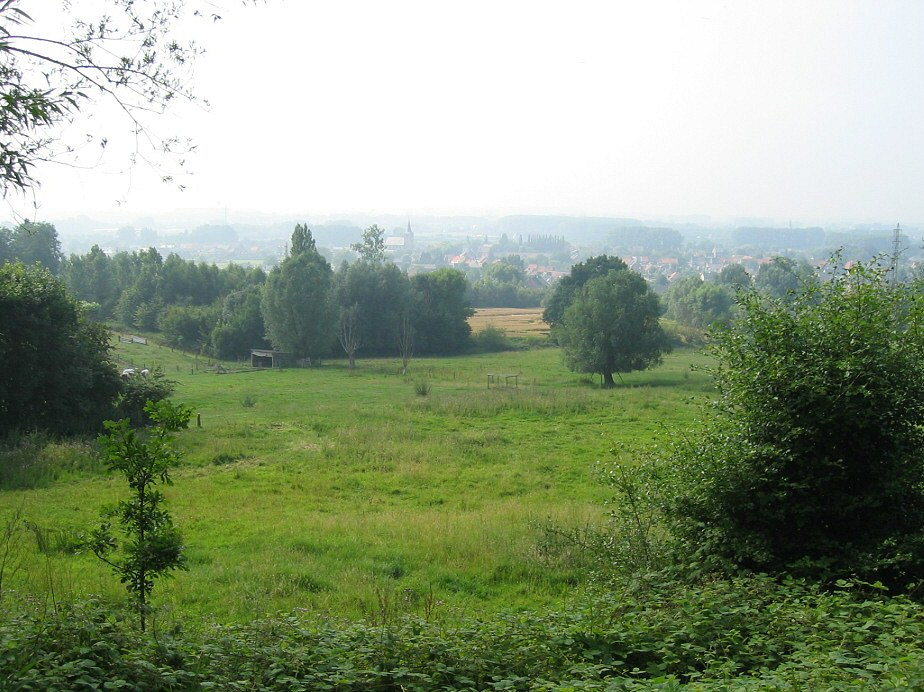

- Location in Belgium
- Coordinates: 50°51′N 3°37′E
- Country: Belgium
- Region: Flemish Region
- Community: Flemish Community
- Province: East Flanders
- Municipality: Oudenaarde

Area
  - Total: 2.21 km^{2} (0.85 sq mi)

Population (2021)
  - Total: 3,162
  - Density: 1,430/km^{2} (3,710/sq mi)
- Postal codes: 9700

Ename is a Belgian village in the Flemish province of East Flanders. It stands on the right side of the river Scheldt and it is part of the municipality of Oudenaarde. The territory was inhabited during Prehistoric and Roman times, and became a trade settlement during the 10th century. From the 11th century it was part of the domain of the Benedictine abbey of Saint Salvator, until its 1795 dissolution in the aftermath of the French Revolution. The remains of the Saint Salvator abbey are today part of a major heritage project in Flanders, established by the Province of East-Flanders. The Provincial Archaeological Museum of Ename displays the major finds that have been excavated on the abbey site. Today the village of Ename hosts the Museumnacht in July and the Feeste t' Ename with the traditional horse market that has been held for centuries during the celebrations of the patron hallow Saint Laurentius, on the 10th of August.

== History ==
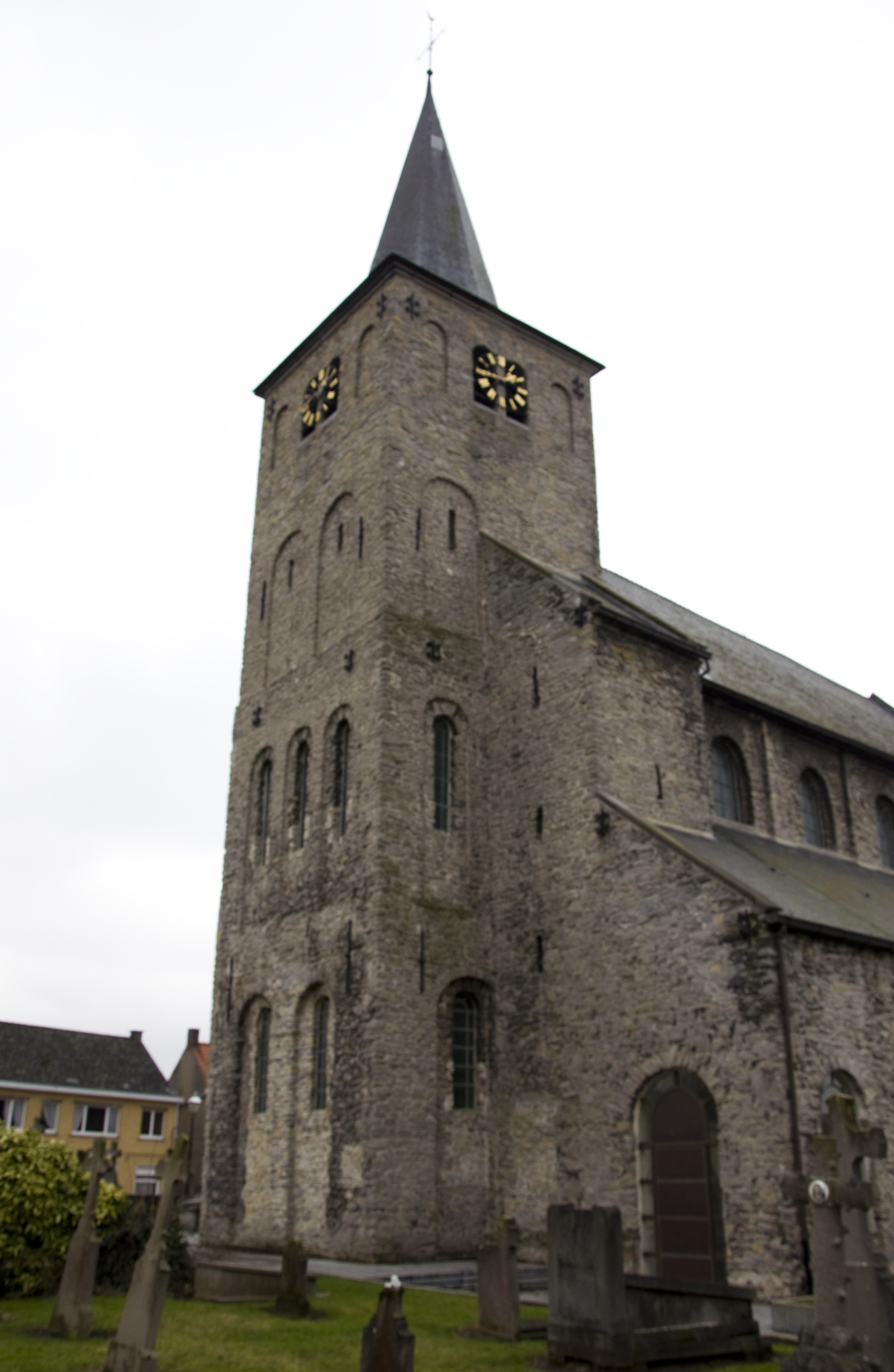
Saint Laurentius church of Ename

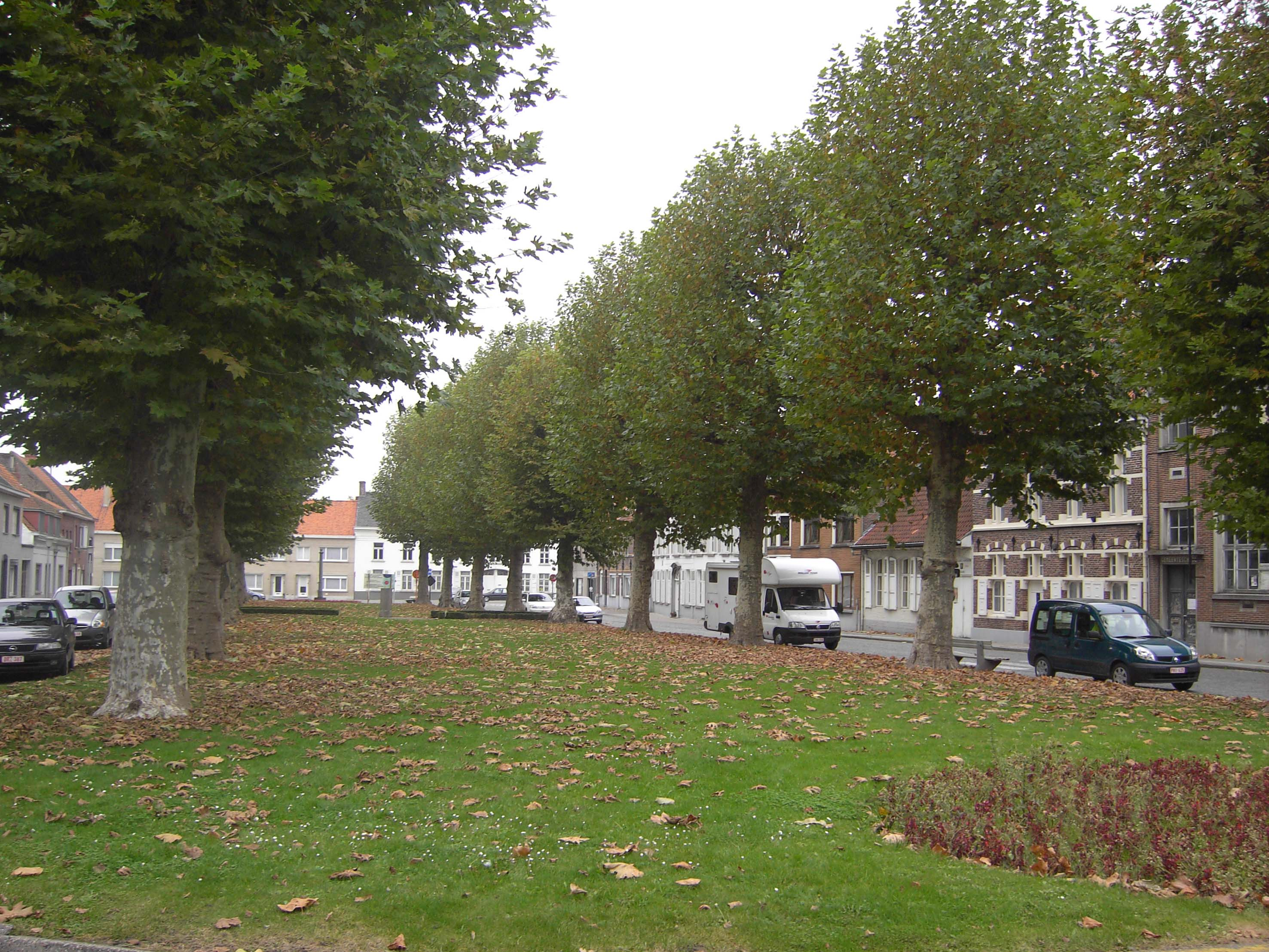
Enameplein

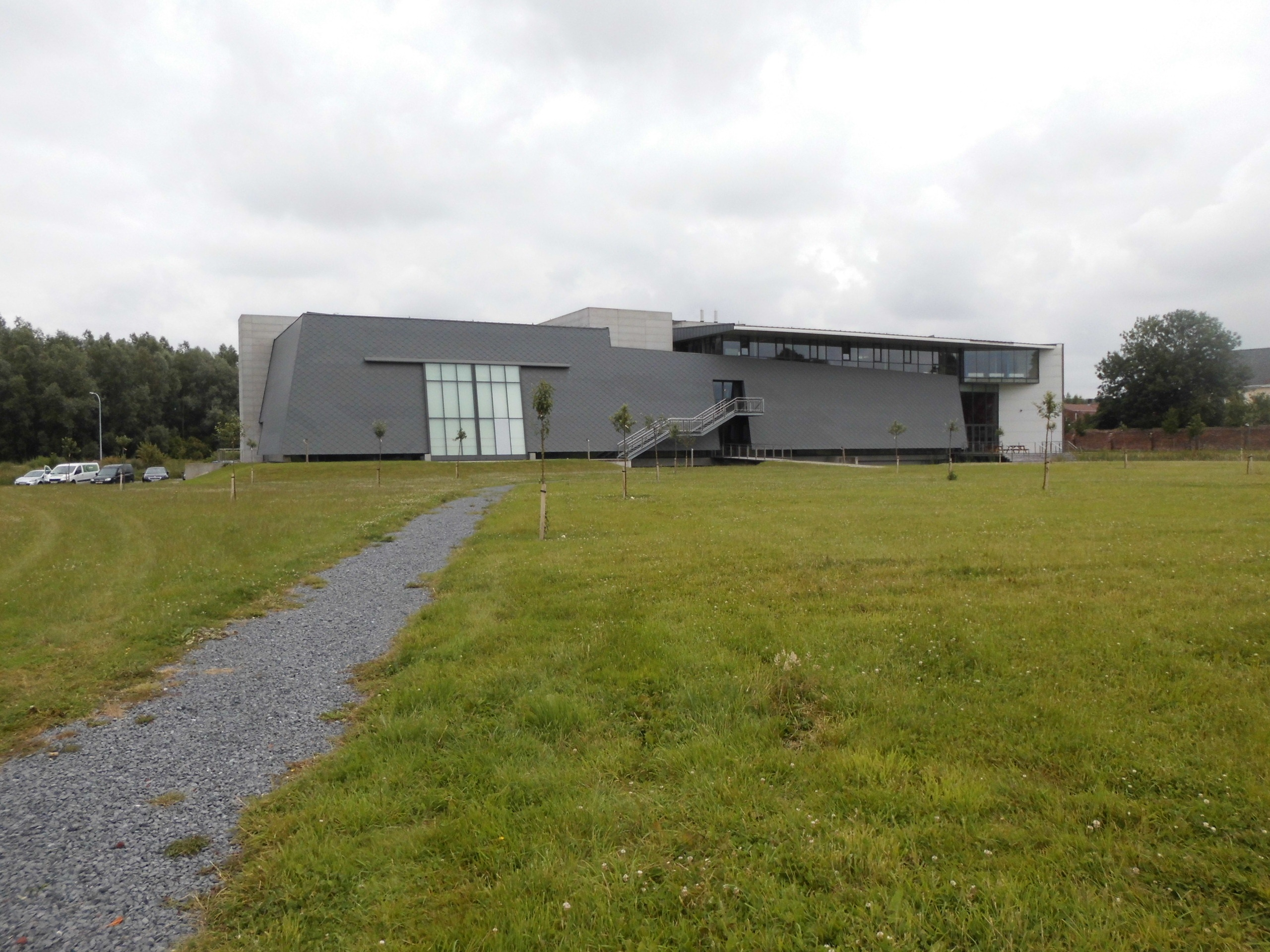
Provincial Heritage Center

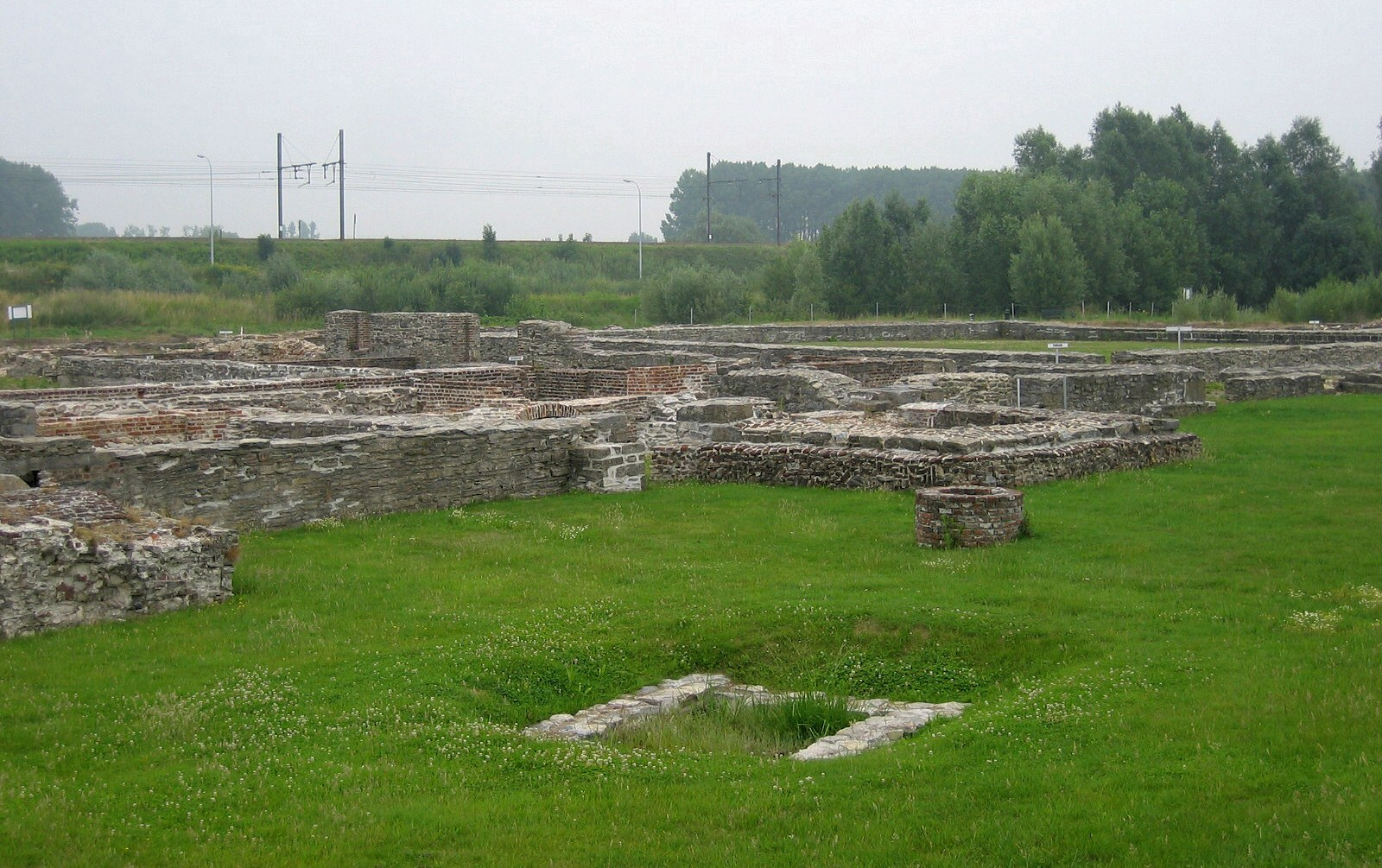
Archaeological park. Saint Salvator abbey

=== Early history ===
The human presence in this area dates back to more than 5000 years ago. Human activity in this region can be traced back to the middle-neolithicum....

=== Roman time ===
Ename was close to the major Roman road that led from Boulogne-sur-Mer to Cologne and the road that, from Bavay, went northwards toward Ghent. The site was used for agriculture. Small fragments of Roman pottery from the 1st and 2nd century AD were found underneath Saint Laurentius church. During the 2nd and 3rd centuries, after the invasion by German Tribes, these territories were used for agriculture. They were then abandoned for two centuries before agricultural activity was resumed.

=== Middle Ages ===
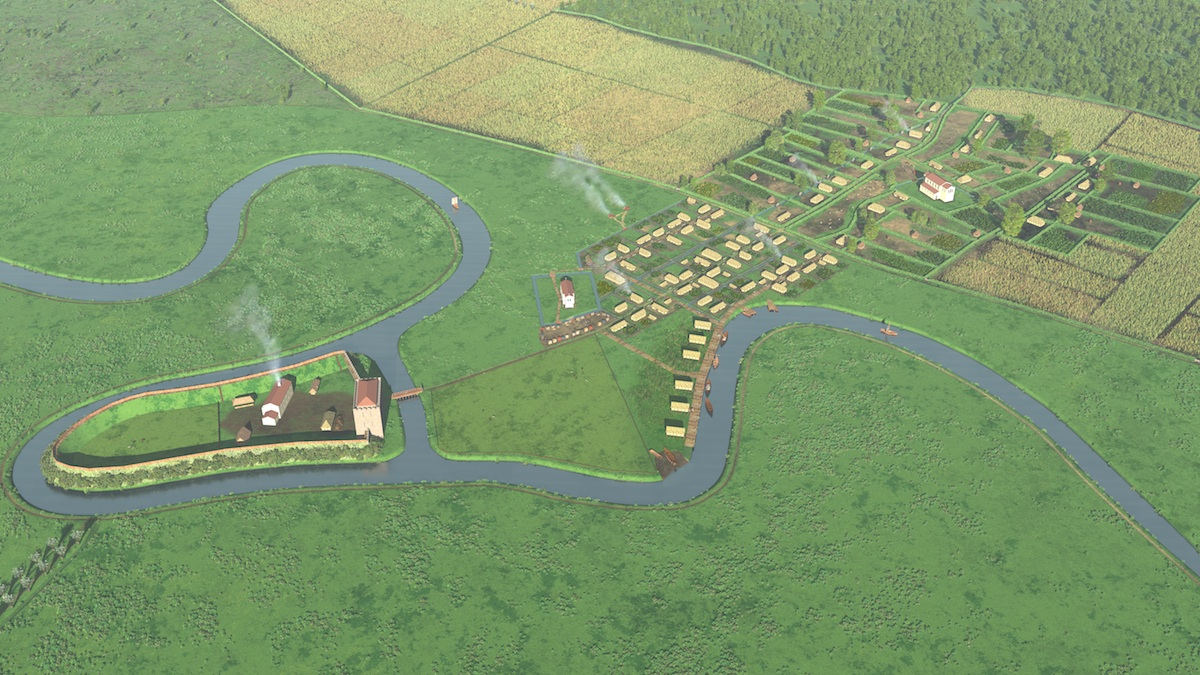
3D reconstruction of the village of Ename in 1020, based on archaeological finds. On the left the palace building and the keep enclosed by walls, in the center the trade center around Saint Salvator church, on the right the village.

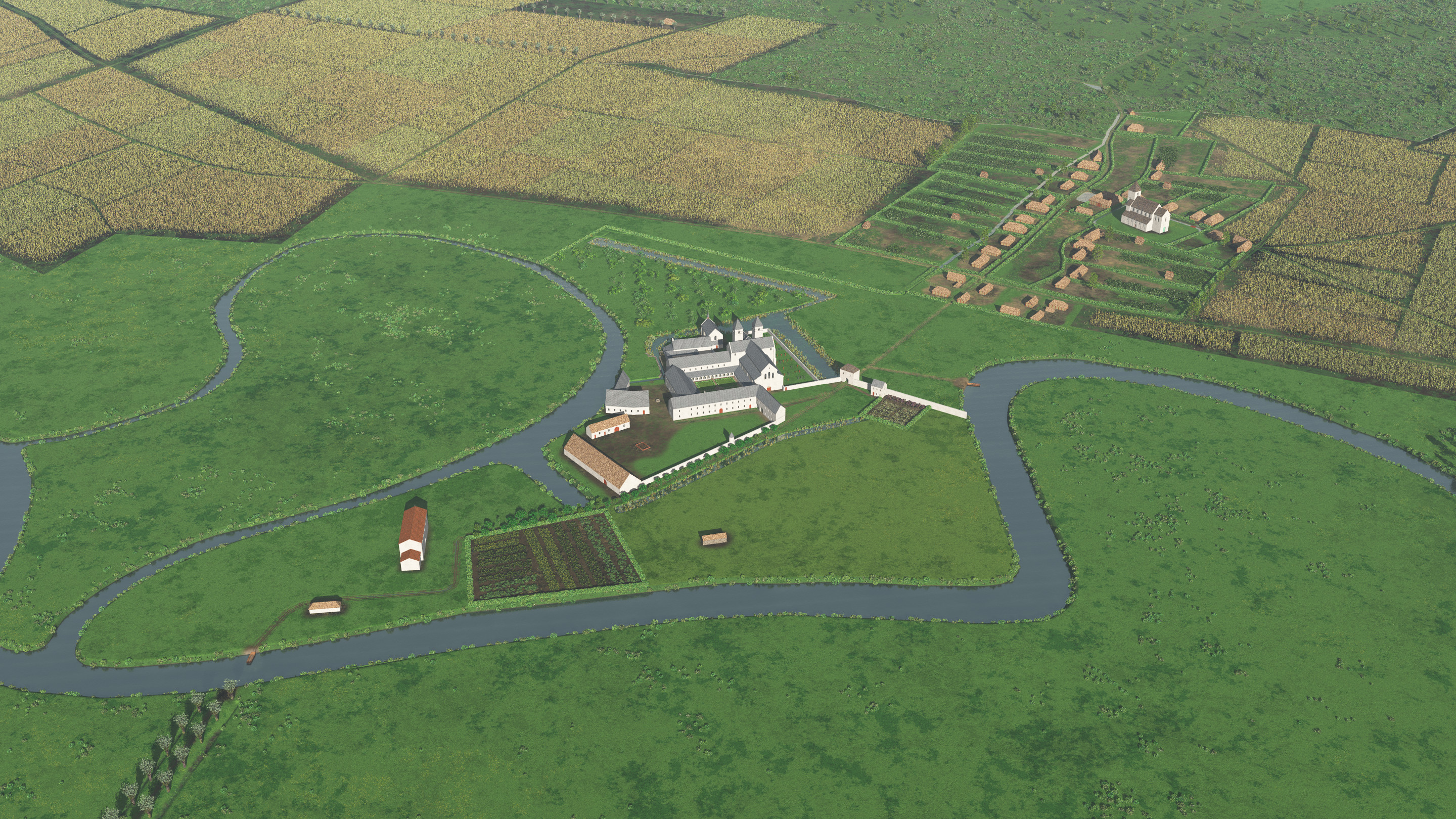
3D reconstruction of Ename and Saint Salvator abbey at the end of the 13th century.

In early medieval Frankish times, the territory of Ename was under the control of the Saint Peter's abbey of Ghent. It was part of the villa Ehinham, a rural domain whose centre was in the nearby village of Nederename.

Shortly before the year 1000, it was transformed into an important trade settlement and military stronghold. After the Frankish king Otto I was proclaimed emperor of the Holy Roman Empire by Pope John XII in 962, he tried to strengthen his grip on his vast empire. His policy consisted in assigning strategic areas of his empire to men whose loyalty was proven. For this reason he assigned to count Godfrey of Verdun, a member of his family who had both Carolingian and Ottonian roots, the border zone along the river Scheldt. In 963, Godfrey married Mathilda of Saxony, daughter of Herman Billung, duke of Saxony and right hand of the emperor. She had previously been married to the count of Flanders, Baldwin III, who had died of smallpox in 962. Probably as a wedding gift, the emperor gave Mathilda some properties on the border zones and among them were Ename and Velzeke.

Godfrey ruled the county of Biest (comitatus Biest), one of the four counties which formed the pagus Bracbatensis. It extended southwards from the row of hills around the city of Ronse, to the cities of Ghent and Dendermonde in the north. Godfrey and Mathilda initially must have ruled from Velzeke, while they created a trade center with a harbor in Ename, due to its advantageous economic position at the Scheldt. The river marked the border between the Ottonian Empire and the county of Flanders, which was why Ename had also a strategic military position. They probably moved to Ename from 993, and around 995 Godfrey and Matilda built there a keep surrendered by a walled castrum. A stone church dedicated to Saint Salvator was built for the trade settlement and a larger church dedicated to Saint Laurentius was erected in the nearby village.

With the death of Henry II in 1024 there were no direct heirs to the imperial crown: he was the last member of the Ottonian dynasty. His successor, Conrad II, belonged to the Salian dynasty. Once crowned, he surrounded himself with loyal noblemen. The territories of the family of Verdun were then given to the family of Hainaut, and Ename lost his central role. Tensions between the empire and the county of Flanders increased at the beginning of the 11th century. In 1033, the count of Flanders Baldwin IV, conquered Ename. He was not able to keep it for long time; nevertheless, he destroyed the keep. In 1047, his son Baldwin V took possession of Ename. The territory was consecrated in order to prevent any further military use. In 1060, Philip I became King of France at the age of seven. The count of Flanders was his regent together with his mother, the queen Anne of Kiev. Baldwin V was then very powerful. In 1063, the Benedictine abbey of Ename was founded by Adele of France, wife of Baudouin V and daughter of the king of France, Robert II. It was firstly dedicated to Our Lady. In order to provide a financial income to the abbey, the count donated the village of Ename and other properties in the surroundings. The abbey started in the former Ottonian palace building, under the direction of abbot Walbrecht, who had come from the Saint Vaast abbey in Arras. In the founding document it was stated that twelve monks and the abbot should have lived in the abbey. The construction works for the erection of the abbey started immediately around the Saint Salvator church, and the new complex was finished around 1070. The abbey was then founded a second time and was dedicated to Saint Salvator

=== Modern history ===
In the course of the centuries the monastery and the church were rebuilt and enlarged several times. In 1795 the French revolutionaries invaded the southern Netherlands: the monastery was confiscated and sold. After a few years it was dismantled and the pieces sold as building material. The possessions of the abbey were also sold. During the more than seven hundred years that the Saint Salvator abbey existed, Ename remained a rural village.

== Archaeology ==
A century after the demolition of Saint Salvator abbey, in 1895, the mayor of Ename, Edmond Beaucarne, published the results of his research on the historical sources of Ename.

From 1942 to 1947, professor Van de Walle started the excavation campaign that revealed the Romanesque abbey church of Saint Salvator.

The Belgian National Service for Excavations started a second turn of archaeological investigations in 1982, which lasted till 2002, under the management of Dirk Callebaut. Part of the castrum, almost the whole abbey and the settlement underneath were excavated and documented.

Also the church of Saint Laurentius was excavated and studied in a major research project from 1999 to 2002.

From 1984 on, the forest Bos t'Ename was the object of a large-scale historical and ecological investigation aimed at tracing back the evolution of the landscape

The results of all the archaeological and historical investigations on the territory of Ename have been visualised in interactive 3D models, on display on the archaeological site in the Timeframe application. It is a presentation technique that enables the visitors to virtually discover the abbey buildings and the surrounding landscape over several historical periods. Some characters of the history of Ename are used to create a realistic portrait of their era and give information on the life of the inhabitants.

Multilingual information panels at the site inform the visitors during their walk around the remains.

=== Castrum ===
The oldest trace of the use of the area where the castle stood was a waste ditch and treads, dating back to the second half of the 10th century. In the 11th century it was transformed into a walled area that contained a luxury limestone building, comprising an aula, a camera, a chapel; and a donjon, which had walls from three metres (9.8 ft) up to 4.4 metres (14 ft). The foundations of this complex have been excavated and documented.

=== Settlement ===
The settlement was situated on a terrain where three occupation phases have been identified. Two churches were erected in the settlement: the Saint Salvator church, close to the river, and the Saint Laurentius church. The first one, no longer standing, has been excavated and part of the foundation can be visited on the archaeological site, while Saint Laurentius remains today the parish church of Ename. Archaeology revealed that, in the settlement, properties were subdivided into plots delimited by ditches. Constructions were from wood and traces of fireplaces and houses have been excavated in the settlement.

=== Saint Laurentius Church ===
Saint Laurentius church was built around 1000 AD near the common field, in the centre of the village. The Ottonian building had a basilical ground plan, with an eastern and a western choir. During the restoration of the building, traces of the 11th-century decoration were discovered. Above the main altar, parts of a Majestas Domini fresco are still preserved and bear witness to the richness of the medieval decoration of the church

=== Saint Salvator abbey ===
The foundations of the Benedictine abbey of Sain Salvator can be visited in the archaeological site of Ename. The evolution of the abbey, from the first Saint Salvator church of the 9th century to the largest 18th-century complex, can be traced from the intricate evolution of the foundation walls.

== Sights ==
- The Provincial Archaeology Museum pam Ename, where part of the objects excavated in Ename are exhibited in a timeline sequence.
- The Provincial Heritage Centre, that hosts temporary exhibitions.
- Saint Salvator abbey archaeological site.
- Saint Laurentius church.
- The Ename forest.
