= Adelbert Jenkins =

American clinical psychologist

Adelbert H. Jenkins
- Born: Cleveland, Ohio
- Education: Antioch College; University of Michigan
- Known for: A Humanistic Approach to Black Psychology
- Scientific career
- Fields: Psychology
- Workplaces: New York University; American Psychological Association; Association of Black Psychologists

Adelbert H. Jenkins is an African American clinical psychologist who is known for his humanistic approach to Black psychology at the start of the field in the early 1970s. Jenkins was also one of the 28 founding members of the National Association of Black Psychologists, along with other notable psychologists such as Robert V. Guthrie and Joseph White. He is currently an associate professor of psychology at New York University.

== Early life and family ==
Jenkins grew up in Cleveland, Ohio. His parents were both social workers and were raised in the North. At a young age, Jenkins and his family moved to a predominantly White, Jewish neighborhood so that he could attend better public schools; however, he still maintained contact with the African American community through his mother's extended family. His parents were the ones who first suggested that he pursue psychology in college.

Jenkins married in 1969 and he has one son with his wife. His humanistic philosophy has influenced his personal life as well, inspiring him and his wife to become more active churchgoers to provide their son with a spiritual, religious education.

== Education ==
Jenkins attended Antioch College for his undergraduate education where he majored in psychology and minored in philosophy. He was inspired by the work of Ralph Waldo Emerson, and was particularly interested in his philosophy on human potential and independent thinking. In his graduate years, Jenkins became interested in ego psychology, which held that humans are born with basic mental capabilities that are inherently functional before trying to adapt to reality. He was drawn to its emphasis on how humans cope with reality and achieve ego autonomy. He received his Master's in psychology and Ph.D. in clinical psychology from University of Michigan. He received his post-doctoral clinical training from the Albert Einstein College of Medicine.

== Career ==
Jenkins is currently an associate professor of psychology in the Faculty of Arts and Sciences at New York University. His primary area of research focuses on multicultural clinical psychology and its philosophical underpinnings. Influenced by Joseph Rychlak's "logical learning theory," Jenkins is best known for his humanistic philosophy which emphasizes the agency and cultural integrity of ethnic minorities, particularly that of African Americans. His teleological approach challenges the idea that humans are passive, powerless actors whose behavior solely depend on external forces. Instead, he argues that humans are proactive agents with intentionality and purpose, who consequently, can impact their environments. His model of self-agency can be compared to Wade Noble's extended self model, both of which seek to affirm Black racial identity. In Noble's extended self model, individual Black identity is inextricably tied to a collective Black racial identity. However, these collective characteristics of Black behavior and values are misinterpreted when analyzed through a Euro-American perspective. Jenkin's research has been especially influential for clinical psychology in understanding African American styles of communication as consequences of understanding those in higher positions of power. In counseling relationships, exhibiting this kind of cultural competency and understanding the power dynamic when seeing an African American patient is crucial for effective therapy.

Prior to becoming an associate professor of psychology at New York University, Jenkins was the co-director of the clinical psychology internship program at Bellevue Psychiatric Hospital. He has also done private and public human relations consulting work for mental institutions, schools, and organizations such as the Veterans Administration.

Jenkins serves as a Fellow for the American Psychological Association and a Fellow for the Society for Personality Assessment. He is also affiliated with the New York State Psychological Association and National Association of Black Psychologists and was a past chair for its New York Chapter.

== Historical context ==
Amongst the Black Power movement of the late 1960s and early 1970s, Jenkins was part of a generation of Black psychologists who proactively challenged the framework of traditional Western psychology. Jenkins and other Black psychologists not only critiqued the Eurocentric methodologies of psychology, but also its underlying constructs for negatively framing African American behavior as maladaptive and inferior. Historically, it was thought that due to oppression, African Americans developed negative self-concepts that inhibited their own achievements. Jenkins's work marks an important shift in this understanding of Black self-concept towards a positive, self-affirming framework that celebrated the resilience of African Americans.

Black psychologists sought to establish African American psychology as a professional discipline, distinct from traditional psychology in that it would draw from the direct experiences of African American people, and would be used to improve the lives of African American people. In 1968, Jenkins was among the 28 psychologists to formally establish the Association of Black Psychologists. "Guided by self-determination," the Association aimed to support the careers of Black psychologists and to address the neglected needs of the Black community. The Association went on to publish the Journal of Black Psychology, the first academic journal solely dedicated to African American-centered psychology.

In 1972, Reginald L. Jones published Black Psychology, an integral book to the foundation of African American psychology that consolidated theories from the most prominent Black psychologists. Jenkins's article, "A Humanistic Approach to Black Psychology," represented one of three major perspectives to emerge. In the article, he proposes how humanistic approaches differ from mechanistic approaches and how the former offers deeper insight into the unique resilience and cultural perseverance of African Americans. Another perspective came from the work of William A. Hayes and his article, "Radical Black Behaviorism." Hayes argued that biased research comes from the research process, rather than the researchers themselves. In order to mitigate this, "radical Black behaviorism" like classical behaviorism would rely on extreme empiricism, focusing solely on observable behavior while neglecting the "black box". In contrast to Jenkins's humanism, behaviorism assumes less agency from the individual. The third perspective draws from Clark et al. (1975) "Voodoo or IQ: An introduction to African psychology," published in the Journal of Black Psychology. They establish what would eventually be colloquially known as melanin theory. Though it is now mostly disregarded as pseudoscience, the melanin theory stated that darker skinned people produced higher concentrations of adrenaline, causing increased emotionality, sensitivity to the environment, spirituality, and connectedness with nature. This theory was used to refute Black-White differences in intelligence, arguing that these inherent biological differences yield cultural differences in how intelligence is demonstrated. While there is no empirical, biochemical evidence for the theory, Clark et al. raised important concerns the limited ways by which the field of psychology was measuring intelligence, and the possibility of multiple types of intelligence.

== A Humanistic Approach to Black Psychology ==
As part of Reginald L. Jones's anthology, Black Psychology, Jenkins wrote "A Humanistic Approach to Black Psychology" in which he criticizes western psychology for its mechanistic perspective on human psychology, and argues for a humanistic approach to fully understand the African American experience. Jenkins first compares mechanistic and humanistic perspectives on three facets of human functioning: extraspective versus introspective intent, unipolar versus bipolar meaning, and passive versus active mentality. In psychology's early attempts to replicate the natural sciences, it was believed that outside observation would adequately describe behavior. However, humanism suggests that this neglects the actor's intent and motivation for acting a certain way - aspects that require introspective analysis and are just as valuable to understanding human psychology. Mechanism also affords people to find unipolar understanding, meaning they seek unambiguous, singular explanations. Humanism on the other hand, advocates for bipolar meaning - meaning that is defined by its opposite or alternative scenario. For example, psychological research has repeatedly tried to prove that Blacks are inherently inferior to Whites. A mechanistic analysis might say that Black people have internalized this hierarchy and have developed a negative self-concept. This overlooks Black people's impressive resilience in maintaining self-affirmation, in spite of being oppressed. Finally, Jenkins argues that mechanism inaccurately portrays individual mentality as Lockean "blank slates," such that human development is contingent on the external stimuli shaping it. Rather, he believes that the Kantian view of an active mentality that constructs meaning from the environment is more accurate of how humans actually develop.

Jenkins goes on to suggest how humanism can improve education and psychotherapy for African Americans. He argues that intelligence tests poorly capture students' true abilities, much less their potential for future achievement. From a humanist lens, all groups have equal potential for achievement, and there are multiple facets to intelligence aside from a singular cognitive ability. He argues that the onus should be on educators to recognize and develop the diverse capabilities and skills of their students. Finally, Jenkins offers insight into African American psychology that may hinder psychotherapy for African American patients. African Americans may use less verbal communication, may be more suspicious of mental health institutions, and may view their relationship with their therapist as more interpersonal than instrumental. To mitigate this, Jenkins recommends Schwaber's work on empathy as a way to use humanistic introspection to strengthen the client-therapist relationship.

== The Influence of Minority Group Cultural Models on Persistence in College ==
Though most of his writing is theoretical, Jenkins co-authored this empirical article that was published in the Journal of Negro Education (2004), showing that college persistence among Black students varied depending on the cultural background of the student's family. Drawing upon John Ogbu's cultural-ecological model, the research distinguishes between students whose fathers are "voluntary" immigrants (those who are born outside of the United States and willingly immigrated) and "involuntary" immigrants (those who are descendants of people unwillingly moved to the United States). In the longitudinal study, the researchers found that Black students whose fathers are voluntary immigrants were significantly more likely to stay in college for six semesters (60%) than those whose fathers are involuntary immigrants (36%). However, GPA did not significantly differ between the two groups, suggesting that general academic ability is the same across groups. Placement tests were found to be more predictive of persistence for students of voluntary immigrants, but less so for students of involuntary immigrants.

The results suggest that something other than academic ability distinguishes the two groups. The researchers hypothesize that the two groups have different cultural models, namely that involuntary immigrants are more aware of prejudice and racism whereas voluntary immigrants disregard these experiences and continue to believe in the effectiveness of American schooling as a method for social mobility. However, they warn against using this distinction as a universal framework, that is, it would be inappropriate to assume individual characteristics on the basis of their membership to a certain ethnic group. Jenkins and his co-authors conclude by encouraging academic settings to acknowledge the diversity within the Black community and to tailor their curriculum to the different cultural models that students bring.

== Honors ==
• President, Division 24, Theoretical and Philosophical Psychology, American Psychological Association, 2003-2004
• "Golden Dozen" Award for excellence in teaching, New York University Faculty of Arts and Science, 1988
• Martin Luther King, Jr./Rosa Parks Visiting professor in psychology, University of Michigan, Ann Arbor, 1987
• "Scholar of the Year" Award, National Association of Black Psychologists, 1983
• "Psychologist of the Year", National Association of Black Psychologists, 1976

== Selected publications ==
• Jenkins, A.H. (2005). Creativity and resilience in the African American experience. The Humanistic Psychologist, 33, 25–33.
• Jenkins, A.H. (2004). A humanistic approach to Black psychology. in R. Jones (Ed.), Black Psychology, 4th ed, (pp. 135–155). Hampton, VA:Cobb & Henry.
• Jenkins, A.H. (2001). Individuality in cultural context: The case for psychological agency. Theory and Psychology, 11, 347–362.
• Jenkins, A.H. (2001). Humanistic psychology and multiculturalism: A review and reflection. In K. Schneider, J. Bugental, & J. Pierson (Eds.), The Handbook of Humanistic Psychology (pp. 37–45). Thousand Oaks, CA: Sage.
• Jenkins, A.H. (1997). The empathic context in psychotherapy with people of color. In A. Bohart and L. Greenberg (Eds.), Empathy reconsidered: New directions in psychotherapy. APA Books: Washington, DC.
• Jenkins, A.H. (1997). Free will and psychotherapy. Journal of Theoretical and Philosophical Psychology, 17, 1–13.
• Jenkins, A.H. (1995). Psychology of African Americans: A humanistic approach. Needham, MA: Allyn & Bacon. (Also published as Turning corners: The psychology of African Americans. Needham, MA: Allyn & Bacon.)
• Jenkins, A.H. (1992). Hermeneutics versus science in psychoanalysis: A "rigorous" humanistic view. Psychoanalytic Psychology.
• Jenkins, A.H. (1990). Self-disclosure and the non-White ethnic minority patient, in G. Stricker and M.N. Fisher (Eds.), Self-disclosure in the therapeutic relationship. New York: Plenum.
• Jenkins, A.H. (1989). Psychological agency: A crucial concept for minorities. Theoretical and Philosophical Psychology, 9, 4–11.

== See also ==
• Humanism
• Teleology
• Joseph Rychlak (psychologist)
• John Ogbu (anthropologist)
