= Dilbert (disambiguation) =

Dilbert is an American comic strip.

Dilbert may also refer to:

== 1990s cartoon ==
- Dilbert (character), the title character of the comic strip
- Dilbert (TV series), a television series based on the comic strip
- Dilbert principle, a 1990s satirical observation

== World War II–era cartoon ==
- Dilbert Groundloop, a cartoon character who is a bumbling navy pilot
- Dilbert Dunker, a device for training air pilots to escape a submerged plane

== See also ==
- Delbert (disambiguation)
