= Adalberto =

Adalberto is the Romance version of the Latinized form (Albertus) of Germanic Adalbert. It is used in Italian, Portuguese and Spanish. It derives from the Old German Athala (meaning noble) and Berth (meaning bright). Notable people with the name include:

- Adalberto the Margrave (fl. 10th century), Italian noble-man
- Adalberto Tejeda Olivares (1888–1960), Mexican politician
- Prince Adalberto, Duke of Bergamo (1898–1982), Italian general and nobleman
- Adalberto Libera (1903–1963), Italian architect
- Adalberto Cardoso (1905–1972), Brazilian long-distance runner
- Adalberto Pereira dos Santos (1905–1984), Brazilian general and politician
- Adalberto Ortiz (1914–2003), Ecuadorian politician
- Adalberto Martínez Chávez, a.k.a. Resortes (1916–2003), Mexican actor
- Adalberto Almeida y Merino (1916–2008), Mexican Catholic prelate
- Adalberto López (1923–1996), Mexican football striker
- Adalberto Lepri (1929–2014), Italian wrestler
- Adalberto Rodríguez (1934–2015), Puerto Rican actor and comedian
- Adalberto Arturo Rosat (1934–2015), Bolivian bishop
- Adalberto Santiago (born 1937), Puerto Rican salsa singer
- Adalberto Hernández (born 1938), Mexican boxer
- Adalberto Maria Merli (born 1938), Italian actor
- Adalberto Scorza (born 1938), Argentine race walker
- Adalberto Giazotto (1940–2017), Italian physicist
- Adalberto Rodríguez Giavarini (born 1944), Argentine economist and diplomat
- Adalberto Siebens (born 1946), Puerto Rican boxer
- Adalberto Álvarez (born 1948), Cuban pianist and composer
  - Adalberto Álvarez y su Son, Cuban band by the pianist
- Adalberto Álvarez Marines (born 1952), Mexican artist
- Adalberto Campos Fernandes (born 1958), Portuguese politician
- Adalberto Jordan (born 1961), Cuban-American judge
- Adal Ramones (born 1961), Mexican television show host
- Adalberto Costa Júnior (born 1962), Angolan politician
- Adalberto Machado (born 1964), Brazilian football left-back
- Adalberto Bravo (born 1965), Venezuelan-American musician
- Adalberto García (born 1967), Brazilian long-distance runner
- Adalberto Figarolo di Gropello (fl. 1967–1971), Italian diplomat
- Adalberto Madero (born 1969), Mexican lawyer and politician
- Adalberto Ribeiro (born 1969), Portuguese football centre-back
- Adalberto Mendez (athlete) (born 1974), Dominican sprinter
- Adalberto Silva (born 1979), Brazilian volleyball player
- Adalberto Palma (born 1981), Mexican football defender
- Adalberto Méndez (born 1982), Dominican baseball player
- Adalberto Román (born 1987), Paraguayan football centre-back
- Adalberto (footballer, born 1964), Brazilian football left back
- Adalberto (footballer, born 1987), Brazilian football centre-back
- Adalberto Mejía (born 1993), Dominican baseball pitcher
- Adalberto Mondesí (born 1996), American baseball player
- Adalberto Peñaranda (born 1997), Venezuelan football forward
- Adalberto Carrasquilla (born 1998), Panamanian football midfielder
- Adalberto Ottone Rielander (died 2002), Papua New Guinean clergyman and bishop

== See also ==
- Adalbert (disambiguation)
- Adelbert (disambiguation)
- Alberto (disambiguation)
- Albert (disambiguation)
