= Reginald L. Jones =

Psychologist

- Born: January 21, 1931; Clearwater, Florida
- Died: September 24, 2005 (aged 74); Hampton, Virginia
- Education: Morehouse College; Wayne State University; Ohio State University
- Known for: Black Psychology
- Scientific career
- Fields: Psychology
- Workplaces: University of California, Berkeley
- Doctoral advisor: John Horrocks

Reginald Lanier Jones (January 21, 1931 – September 24, 2005) was a clinical psychologist, college professor, and a founding member and past president of the Association of Black Psychologists. He is best known for his work in special education and the psychology of African Americans.

== Early life and family ==
Jones was born in Clearwater, Florida on January 21, 1931, to his mother, Naomi Henry, a homemaker, and his father, Moses Jones, a musician. His parents were never married and he had a younger half-brother and half-sister, both of whom were the children of his mother and stepfather.

During his childhood, Florida was still racially segregated and experiences with discrimination were common. Nevertheless, Jones grew up with a supportive community of neighbors and family members. Jones and his family were avid readers of two Black newspapers, the Pittsburgh Courier and the Miami Times. He grew up surrounded by frequent discussions on race, racial differences, and the accomplishments of notable Black figures. Jones also recalls spending summers visiting Pennsylvania, where his father would fervently introduce him to all kinds of people as an attempt to educate him in the "ways of the world." His exposure to diverse issues of race and humanity would go on to inform his career and professional interests.

Jones was married twice. He first married to Johnette Turner, an artist he met at Ohio State University, and had three daughters with her. In 1988, he married his second wife, Michele Woods, and was the stepfather to her two children.

== Education ==
Jones grew up attending a Black public elementary school and went to Booker T. Washington High School. He enrolled in Morehouse College in 1948 for his undergraduate education, intending to major in chemistry. However, after a semester of chemistry courses, Jones discovered his interest and talent for psychology. Evelyn Barnett was the only Psychology professor at Morehouse and was one of Jones's first influencers in his psychology career. Jones was also able to take several off-campus courses at Spelman College, Atlanta University, and Clark College. In 1952, he received his bachelor's degree in psychology from Morehouse. Afterwards he enrolled for the graduate clinical psychology program at Wayne University and completed his thesis on ethnocentrism within White individuals. After completing his MA, in 1954, he was drafted into the U.S. Army as a clinical psychologist. During his two years in the army, Jones was stationed at Fort Campbell, Kentucky and Bad Cannstatt, Germany. Jones then enrolled in the doctoral program in the Department of Psychology and Educational Psychology at Ohio State University. He was advised by John Horrocks, a developmental psychologist. Jones attributes his expertise to the program's comprehensiveness and breadth, which allowed him to apply psychological principles to his more specialized research in Black psychology and special education. He received his Ph.D. in psychology from Ohio State University in 1959.

== Career ==
Jones was employed at 9 different higher education institutions during his 33-year academic career. Immediately after receiving his Ph.D., he chose to accept a Research Assistant Professor position at Miami University in Oxford, Ohio. In 1963, he moved to Fisk University in Nashville to become an assistant professor of psychology. He stayed for a year and advises the master's theses of William Hayes, Moses Johnson, and Angela Owens. He had a brief summer appointment with Indiana University before moving to UCLA in 1964 as an assistant professor of education. There, Jones worked with Frank M. Hewett to develop a Ph.D. program in special education. Until then, there was no doctoral program in special education at any of the University of California campuses. Jones helped develop and teach courses in areas of gifted and retarded education, recruit faculty for the program, and form partnerships with California State University, Los Angeles. In 1966, he returned to Ohio State University as an associate professor of psychology. After just two years, he was promoted to full professorship with tenure and was also appointed to Vice Chair for Staff Development. Jones then accepted professorship at University of California, Riverside in their new School of Education. He was a faculty member for two years before becoming the department chair. In 1971, Jones moved his career abroad to become Director of the University Testing Center at Halle Sellassie I University in Ethiopia. He spent his two years there mostly responsible for developing admissions tests to the university. He then accepted a position as Professor of African American Studies and Education at the University of California, Berkeley where he spent 17 years - the longest he spent at any one university. In addition to being a professor, he eventually held other academic and administrative positions at UC Berkeley. Finally, he left UC Berkeley in 1991 and Jones ended his career at Hampton University as a department chair and Professor of Psychology. He stayed at Hampton until 2001 when he decided to retire.

Jones's primary research interests were the education of exceptional children and the psychology of African Americans. His extensive experience at numerous universities helped lay the groundwork for both fields. Apart from his career as a professor, Jones was also one of the founding members of the Association of Black Psychologists and the Association's president from 1971 to 1972. As a leader in establishing Black psychology, Jones was active in pushing the American Psychological Association to provide more support for Black students, faculty, and the community at large. He was highly successful in receiving grants to support minority students and special education research. Jones also contributed to the public sector by being part of President-elect Bill Clinton's Council of Advisors's Education Transition Team, and President Nixon's Task Force on Mental Health.

Throughout his career, Jones worked to improve the assessment and education of children from historically underrepresented backgrounds, particularly in special education. In addition to his scholarship on Black psychology, he published numerous works on the education of gifted children. He challenged the use of standardized psychological assessments that were not developed and normed for culturally diverse populations. Later in his career, he authored the Handbook of Tests and Measurements for Black Populations, which was created to improve culturally informed psychological assessment.

Jones also made significant contributions as an educator and mentor throughout his time in academia. At the University of California, Los Angeles, he helped establish a doctoral training program, focused on special education, by developing new courses, recruiting faculty, and creating partnerships with other universities. His commitment to training and education was a reflection of the themes he later emphasized in Black Psychology, including the importance of expanding opportunities for historically underrepresented communities within psychology.

Jones's career also included international work. From 1971 to 1973, he served as Director of the University Testing Center at Haile Selassie I University in Ethiopia. While there, he was responsible for developing university admissions examinations. This appointment signified his longstanding involvement in educational measurement and university assessment. These areas were also central to his scholarly career.

== Historical context ==
Jones's influence in Black psychology came at a time when the Black Power Movement sought Black empowerment and recognition for the Black community. In mainstream psychology, studies often concluded that Black-White differences were due to deficiencies in Black people. In an interview, Jones explains the problem with this framework:

Now, the research always has the middle-class black child compared to the lower-class white child. Nobody ever talked about the middle-class blacks or upper middle-class blacks. Everything was lower class, and that's a problem of methodology. It's a methodological flaw in the research because you need to have comparable social classes and comparable races to make a valid comparison. That was never done. So, what happened, since the government was pouring tens of millions of dollars into studying the black child in relationship to the middle-class white child—there were hundreds, probably thousands, of research studies—they all concluded that on whatever dimension was studied, practically, the black child was deficient in some way. (Jones, 2003)

Thus, the impetus for establishing the Association of Black Psychologists and for writing Black Psychology was to re-evaluate these biases and legitimize Black psychology as a field created by and for the Black community.

== Black Psychology ==
First published in 1972, Jones wrote Black Psychology an anthology of works from prominent Black psychologists such as Joseph White, Adelbert Jenkins, and Robert Williams, that seemed "positive and relevant to what might be called black psychology.". This seminal book presented the major approaches to establishing Black psychology, and called for rejecting using the White middle class as the psychological norm and for studying the strengths instead of the weaknesses of Black people. Later editions of the book would shift from critiquing mainstream psychology to including more original theory and research. In the third edition, published in 1991, a section called "Deconstruction" was devoted to critically evaluating the accuracy and validity of mainstream literature. At the time, hundreds of studies concluded that African Americans have an external locus of control and had less ability to delay gratification, meaning that African Americans have less control of their impulses. Articles in "Deconstruction" presented studies that debunked these conclusions. On the contrary, a section titled "Reconstruction" was devoted to analyzing the strengths of Black people and maintaining psychological well-being while living in a racist society. The fourth edition introduced more research with an Afrocentric perspective, the idea that African culture is ultimately what forms the basis for African American culture and psychology.

== Honors ==
Jones has received a number of awards and fellowships during his career as a psychologist. Some of his most notable honors include:

• Fellow, American Psychological Association
• Distinguished Career Contributions to Education and Training in Psychology Award, American Psychological Association, 2003
• Lifetime Achievement Award for the Psychological Study of Ethnic Minority Issues, American Psychological Association, 2003
• Scholarship Award, Association of Black Psychologists, 1979, 1986, 1999
• Berkeley Citation, University of California, Berkeley, 1991
• Distinguished Psychologist Award, Association of Black Psychologists, 1989
• Citation for Distinguished Achievement, Ohio State University
• J.E. Wallace Wallin Award, Council for Exceptional Children
• Education Award, American Association on Mental Retardation

== Selected publications ==
Jones has published and edited more than 200 articles, 20 books, and 28 instructional videotapes. Some of his most notable books include:

• Jones, R. L. (2004). Black psychology . Cobb & Henry Publishers.
• Jones, R. L. (1996). Handbook of tests and measurements for Black populations (Vol. 2). Cobb & Henry.
• Jones, R. L. (1989). Black adult development and aging. Cobb & Henry Publishers.
• Jones, R. L. (1984). Attitudes and Attitude Change in Special Education: Theory and Practice. The Council for Exceptional Children. ERIC Publications.
• Jones, R. L. (1976). Mainstreaming and the Minority Child.
• Jones, R. L. (1971). Problems and Issues in the Education of Exceptional Children.
• Jones, R. L. (1970). New Directions in Special Education.

== See also ==
• Educational psychology
• Joseph White (psychologist)
