= Adelbert Van de Walle =

Flemish-Belgian architect, art historian and professor

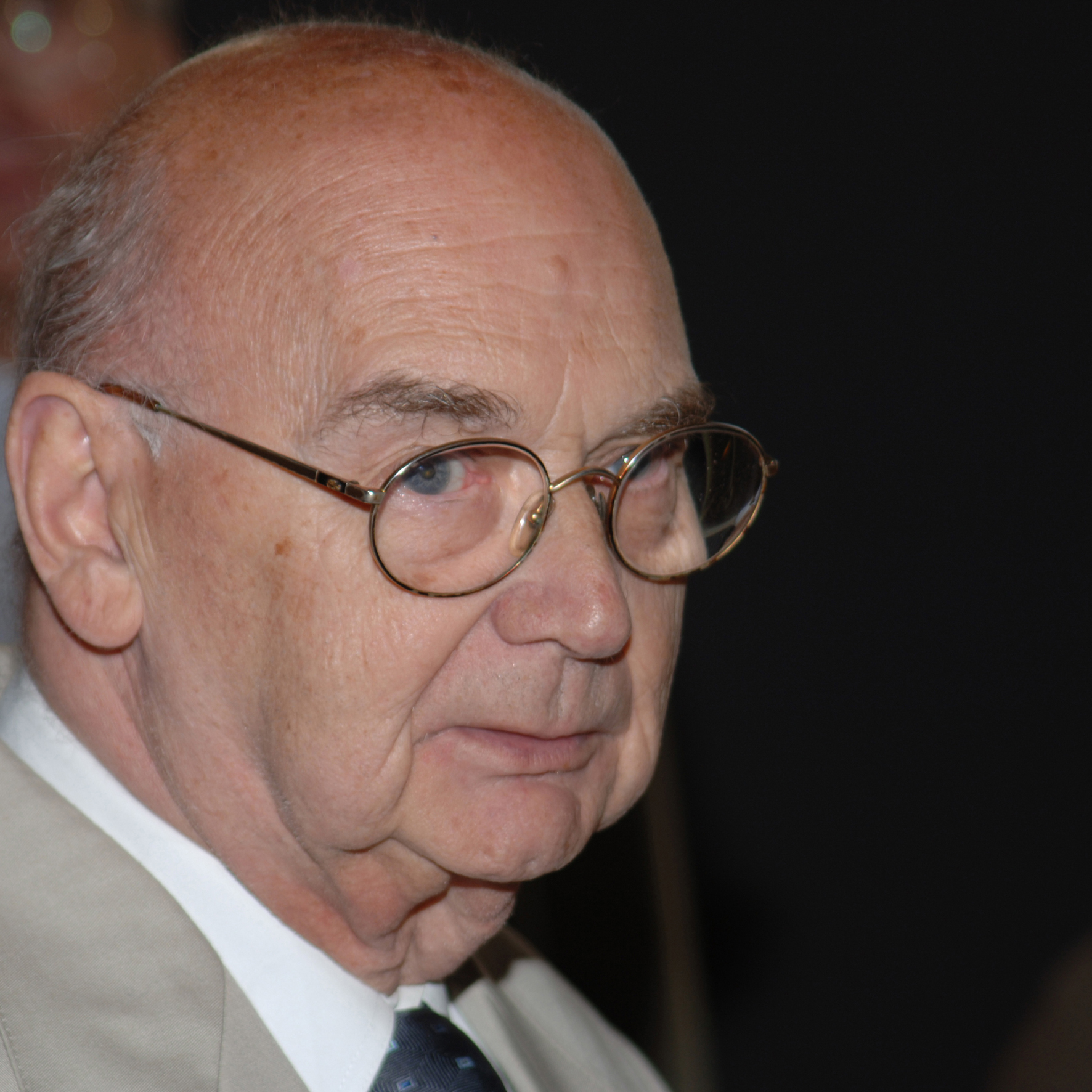
- Born: 11 August 1922; Oudenaarde, Belgium
- Died: 28 June 2006 (aged 83); Ghent, Belgium
- Occupations: Architect, art historian, professor at the University of Ghent

Adelbert Van de Walle (1922–2006) was a Flemish-Belgian architect, art historian and professor in the History of Art and Archaeology at the University of Ghent (UGent).

== Life ==
Van de Walle obtained successively academic degrees in Architecture, Master's and Doctorate in the History of Art and Archaeology, specialising in the Middle Ages, at UGent. During his studies, his tutors in history were François-Louis Ganshof, Hans Van Werveke and Jan Dhondt. In the History of Art, he was taught by Broeder Firmin De Smidt and Jozef Duverger, Herman Bouchery and R. Roggen.

In addition, he trained in the physics and chemistry of artworks with Eng. Coremans, at UGent. He was also a scientific worker in this speciality for the official founding of the Royal Institute for Cultural Heritage in Brussels.

Even as a young architect he displayed a particular interest in the study, preservation and restoration of mediaeval and post-mediaeval heritage. Later on, he would also be active in contemporary architecture, interior design, furniture, industrial art and industrial design. In his scientific research at UGent, he specialised in mediaeval timber construction and the origins of the gothic style, both religious and secular, in Western Europe.

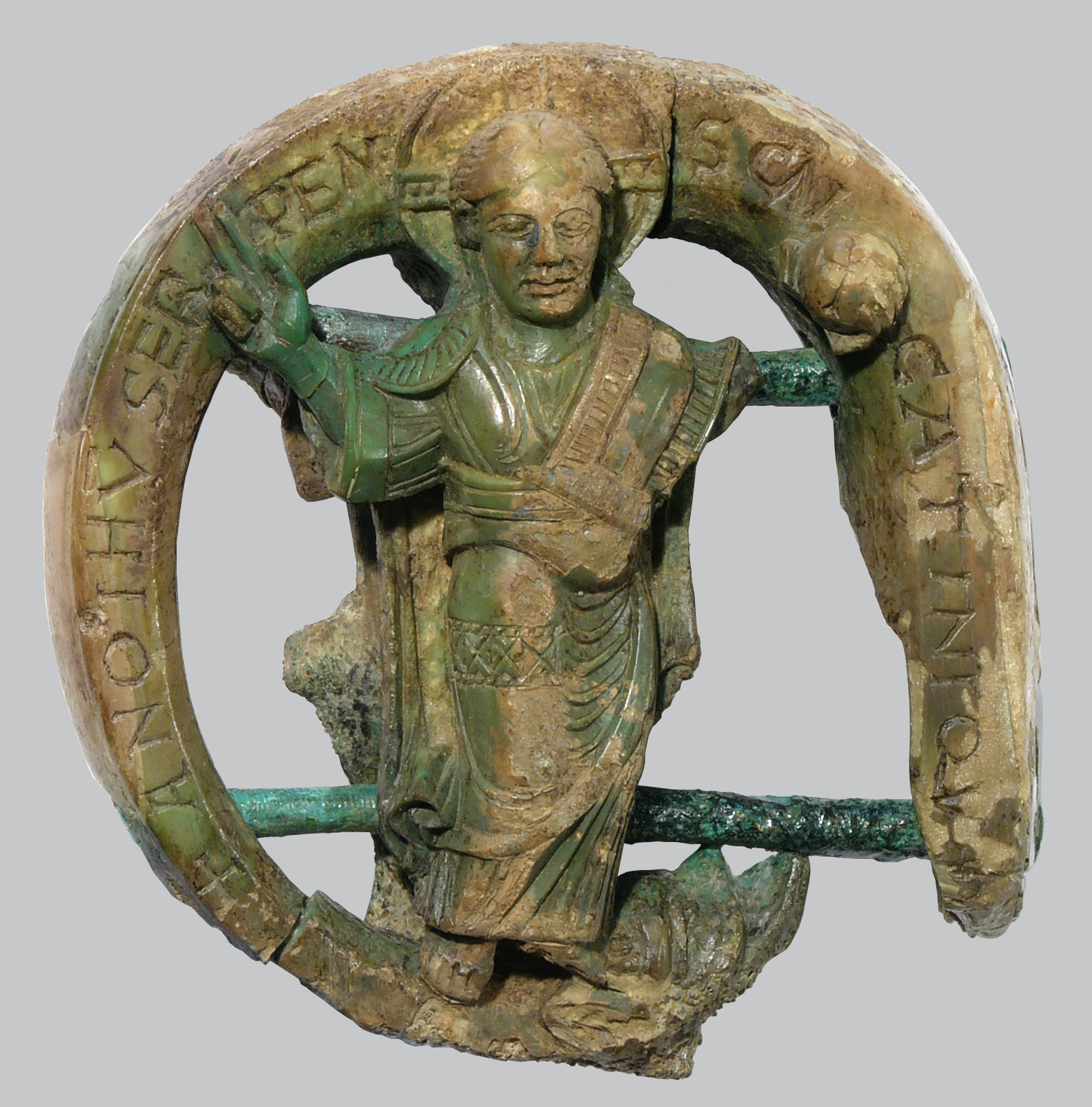
Romanesque Crook of Ename

He is generally considered a pioneer for his earliest large-scale city centre excavation for the Middle Ages. For example, he took the initiative and leadership of the extensive archaeological digs at Ename (the ruins of a castrum, of the settlement church and of Ename Abbey) in 1941–1947, and at Gravensteen castle in Ghent in 1951–1954. He also developed and carried out the first large-scale mediaeval city centre research in Antwerp (Het Steen castle, 1952-1953), the Besaen huis and the former Mattestraat in 1955-1957 and the Sint-Walburgis church in 1957-1961).

He also produced groundbreaking work with his multidisciplinary publications on the history of industrial art (including the first X-ray examinations of antique furniture in 1952). He applied this technique to the "Oxford Chest" (also known as the "Courtrai Chest").

He was always very interested in macro photography in his innovative study of any art object and also as comparative material. This can be seen for example from the entire setup of a project, the collection in three languages: "The Glory of Flanders" (which was not published). He also used the technique in his passionate study of the "Romanesque ivory crook of Ename".

Publications by A.L.J. Van de Walle: books, periodical publications, catalogues, etc. deal with the history of architecture in Belgium, Romanesque and Gothic heritage, sculpture, tapestry art and other industrial art. Others examine modern artistic events, such as in the area of industrial design, plastic arts, engraving, photography, goldsmithing, etc.

At the University of Ghent in his teaching he paid particular attention to applied arts in Western Europe, their techniques and the scientific research methods for which he had established a laboratory.

In addition to his scientific publications, he was also active in fields such as urban renewal, as well as what had been close to his heart in earlier days, interior design and furniture art.

Apart from being an architect, professor in the history of artand archaeology at UGent, he was also vice-chairman of the Commission for Art Professions and Curator of the Museum of Decorative Arts and Crafts, the current Design Museum Gent(1951–1974), the Saint Peter's Abbey, Ghent, and the Hotel d'Hane-Steenhuyse in Ghent. At the same time, he positioned himself as a 'living educator'. These aspirations were to come together at the three National Exhibitions for Modern Social Furniture, which he organised between 1955 and 1957, in conjunction with the architect Dan Craet and designer Frida Burssens.

== Publications ==
=== Books ===
- Histoire de l'architecture en Belgique (1951)
- Geschiedenis van de bouwkunst in België (1951)
- De Sint-Vedastuskerk te Nederename, een 10e-eeuwse praestedelijke moederkerk (1952)
- Het bouwbedrijf in de Lage Landen tijdens de Middeleeuwen (1959) – On the building industry in the Low Countries during the Middle Ages
- L'importation et l'exportation belges de meubles anciens, d'objets de collection, etc. de 1830 à 1959 (1961) – Belgian import and export of antique furniture, collector's items, etc. from 1830 to 1959
- Vademecum voor de identificatie van de techniek van de kunstgravures. Van het begin van de XIXe eeuw tot heden (1966) – A guide to the identification of engraving techniques, from the beginning of the 19th century to the present day
- De Gotiek in België / La Belgique Gothique / Gothic Art in Belgium / Gotische Kunst in Belgien (1972)
- De Vlaamse wandtapijten van de Wawelburcht te Krakau / Les tapisseries flamandes au chateau de Wawel à Cracovie (1972)
- Stad Gent. Museum voor sierkunst en industriële vormgeving: beknopte gids voor de bezoeker met verwijzing naar het inventaris van de kunstvoorwerpen (1973)
- Arrasy Flamandskie W Zamku Krolewkim na Wawelu (1975)
- Der vrijheid laatste hope (1976)
- De droomresidentie van Lieven Bauwens (Tijdschrift voor industriële cultuur, 1998 deel 62)
- De Chest of Courtrai: een diplomatieke koffer anno 1302: zijn techniek en geheim: een interim verslag (Tijdschrift voor industriële cultuur, 2001 deel 74)

=== Exhibition catalogues ===
- De Sint-Niklaaskerk te Gent (1962)
- Dr. Leo H. Baekeland 1863-1963 (1963)
- Onderzoekingen betreffende sociaal-economische technische en artistieke aspecten: 1955–1965 (1965)
- Oud-Iraanse kunst: Prehistorie – protohistorie (1966)
- Marcel Maeyer retrospectieve (1969)
- Luc Peire (1969)
- Braziliaanse volksgravure

=== Articles ===
- Historisch en archeologisch onderzoek van het portus Eename (1944)
- De Romaanse Boudewijnstoren te Oudenaarde (1950)
- De Karolingische muntvonst te Zelzate (1950)
- Trouvaille de monnaies carolingiennes à Zelzate (1950)
- De archeologische opgravingen in het oud stadscentrum te Antwerpen (1960)
- Analyse aux rayons-x, ultra-violets, infra-rouges d'un faux siège Louis XV (1961)
- Excavations in the ancient centre of Antwerp (1961)
- Een weinig gekend meesterwerk van de XVIIIe-eeuwse Vlaamse kunstnijverheid: de kroonluchter door J. F. Allaert te Gent (1968)
- Het bodemonderzoek in het centrum van de stad Antwerpen (1968)
- Antwerpen (1972)
- Niderlandy w okresie powstania arrasów wawelskich (1975)
- Het wetenschappelijk onderzoek in verband met de meubelkunst aan de Rijksuniversiteit te Gent (1976)
- De Gentse Portus aan de Reep (2005)
