= Joseph F. Rychlak =

Joseph Frank Rychlak
- Born: December 17, 1928; Cudahy, Wisconsin, United States
- Died: April 16, 2013 (aged 84)
- Education: University of Wisconsin–Madison; Ohio State University
- Spouse: Lenora Smith
- Children: Ronald Rychlak, Stephanie Stilson (née Rychlak)
- Scientific career
- Fields: Psychology
- Workplaces: Loyola University

Joseph Frank Rychlak (/ˈrɪʃlɒk/; December 17, 1928 – April 16, 2013) was an American psychologist well known for his work with theoretical and philosophical psychology. He developed a theoretical stance known as "Rigorous Humanism." This term refers to Rychlak's argument that psychology with ecological validity should be directed toward issues that are relevant to our lives.

== Biography ==
Rychlak enlisted in the Army-Air Force after graduating from high school and served his enlistment at Barksdale Field in Shreveport, Louisiana. During his time in the military, Rychlak realized that the best way to get ahead in life was to obtain an education. He became inspired to go to college and spent the remainder of his enlistment reading books off of the Harvard List of Great Books, preparing himself for college. He received his B.S. from the University of Wisconsin–Madison, where he graduated Phi Beta Kappa, and his M.A. and Ph.D. in Clinical Psychology from Ohio State University under George A. Kelly. Rychlak worked at Florida State University, Washington State University, Saint Louis University and Purdue University before retiring with emeritus status as the Maude C. Clark Professor in Humanistic Psychology at Loyola University in Chicago, Illinois.

After his graduate degree, Rychlak joined Douglas W. Bray's 25-year Management Progress Study as a personal interviewer. This longitudinal study helped him design a "life themes" scoring system that enabled them to numerically analyze the information he received from his interviews. The scoring system and subsequent data are detailed in his book, Personality and Lifestyle of Young Male Managers: A Logical Learning Theory Analysis.

Rychlak's work can be roughly divided into two main areas: theoretical and empirical. The theoretical area of his work is centered on exploring and understanding the theoretical and philosophical foundations of psychology. The empirical area of his work focuses mainly on scientific experiments designed to empirically test his logical learning theory.

Rychlak authored 17 books and over 200 papers and served as a Fellow in the American Psychological Association, a Fellow in the American Psychological Society, and was twice a president of the APA's division of Theoretical and Philosophical Psychology.

== Family ==
Joseph Rychlak was married to Lenora Rychlak from June 16, 1956 until his death in April, 2013. They have two children, Ronald Rychlak, Stephanie Stilson (née Rychlak), and eight grandchildren. Lenora, also a graduate from Ohio State, assisted Rychlak by being his chief editor of his work and later became his executive assistant at Loyola University.

== Logical learning theory ==
It was when Rychlak was a student of George Kelly at Ohio State University that he felt drawn to the views of Immanuel Kant. Rychlak found that he preferred both the Kantian model of the person and Kelly’s view of person and declared himself a Kantian and teleologist. Teleology, in which events take place for the sake of an end goal, is what led Rychlak to his logical learning theory (LLT). LLT first came to light when Rychlak was working at St. Louis University. It was then that he began to delve into human learning, focusing on cognition and memory, his goal to examine the influence of theories on our concept of human nature. Rychlak wanted to broaden traditional psychology's view of the model of causality. He believed that too much emphasis is on material and sufficient cause, but not on formal and final cause. Rychlak’s LLT examined learning as a teleological practice rather than nontelic aspects of learning. This meant that he thought that all human actions were self-directed through the four causes - material, formal, efficient, and final causes - and not through mechanistic or deterministic causes. Rychlak explains that "the responsibility of LLT (Logical Learning Theory) is to explain the process that moves sound or unsound thought along."

== Artificial intelligence ==
Rychlak's view on artificial intelligence was that it significantly lacked in comparison to human beings, specifically the aspects of human reason. Human activity and thought processes are purposeful, such as participating in the examination of thought and ideas. Rychlak stated that artificial intelligence cannot exhibit such cognitive processes, nor can they predicate meanings like a person can or apply reasoning to rules. Rychlak explains that only humans can have an introspective point of view for reasoning and that this view can be meaningful and purposeful. On the other hand, artificial intelligence exhibits an extraspective point of view. Rychlak explained extraspective as a third-person point of view, and the introspective as first-person. These views demonstrate that the human being is what develops/reasons the process, and artificial intelligence is able to follow the rules and carry the process out.

== Psychology and expert testimony in court ==
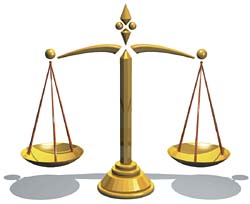
Scale of justice gold

Free will is something many mental health experts dismiss in favor of determinism. According to Rychlak, the modern psychologist dismisses the idea of free will, claiming it as being something disproven by science. Rychlak points out that when dealing with legal matters, free will is abundant and in fact, the Supreme Court maintained their belief on the matter - "men usually intend to do what they do". Rychlak claimed that the determinism that psychology holds on to may have had a negative impact on the law. In a courtroom, a lawyer could look at an expert witness for their opinion on whether a person behaved on their own free will or if there were outside influences. This opinion is tainted by the expert witness’ denial of the existence of free will.

In terms of human behavior, Rychlak believed that the courts couldn't vary from individual to individual in the way the mental health profession could. Where a psychologist can modify their view and treatment of an individual, Rychlak insists that the judicial system looks at full picture of human behavior, employing Aristotle's four causes.

== Notable works ==
- Logical Learning Theory: A Human Teleology and its Empirical Support (Aug 28, 1994). Rychlak presents his logical learning theory, which was his teleological view of the human being.
- Introduction to Personality and Psychotherapy: A Theory Construction Approach. Rychlak outlines the history of theory and philosophy in psychology, distinguishing all theories into either Lockean, Kantian, or mixed-model approaches.
- A Philosophy of Science for Personality Theory. This text has been a foundational work for a subfield of psychology, "theoretical psychology."
- The Psychology of Rigorous Humanism. Rychlak conducts a thorough review of psychology and its efficient/material causal bent. He then proposes a more formal/final causal (telic) perspective that culminates in his Logical Learning Theory for psychology.
- In Defense of Human Consciousness. Rychlak defies trends in psychology, sociology, and science that reduce the role of human intention in thought and behavior. Unlike the many descriptions of the human psyche that rely on behavioralist or biophysical, mechanistic views, this volume presents a model of the mind that reinforces the important role of free will in consciousness.
