= Adelbert Heinrich Graf von Baudissin =

German writer

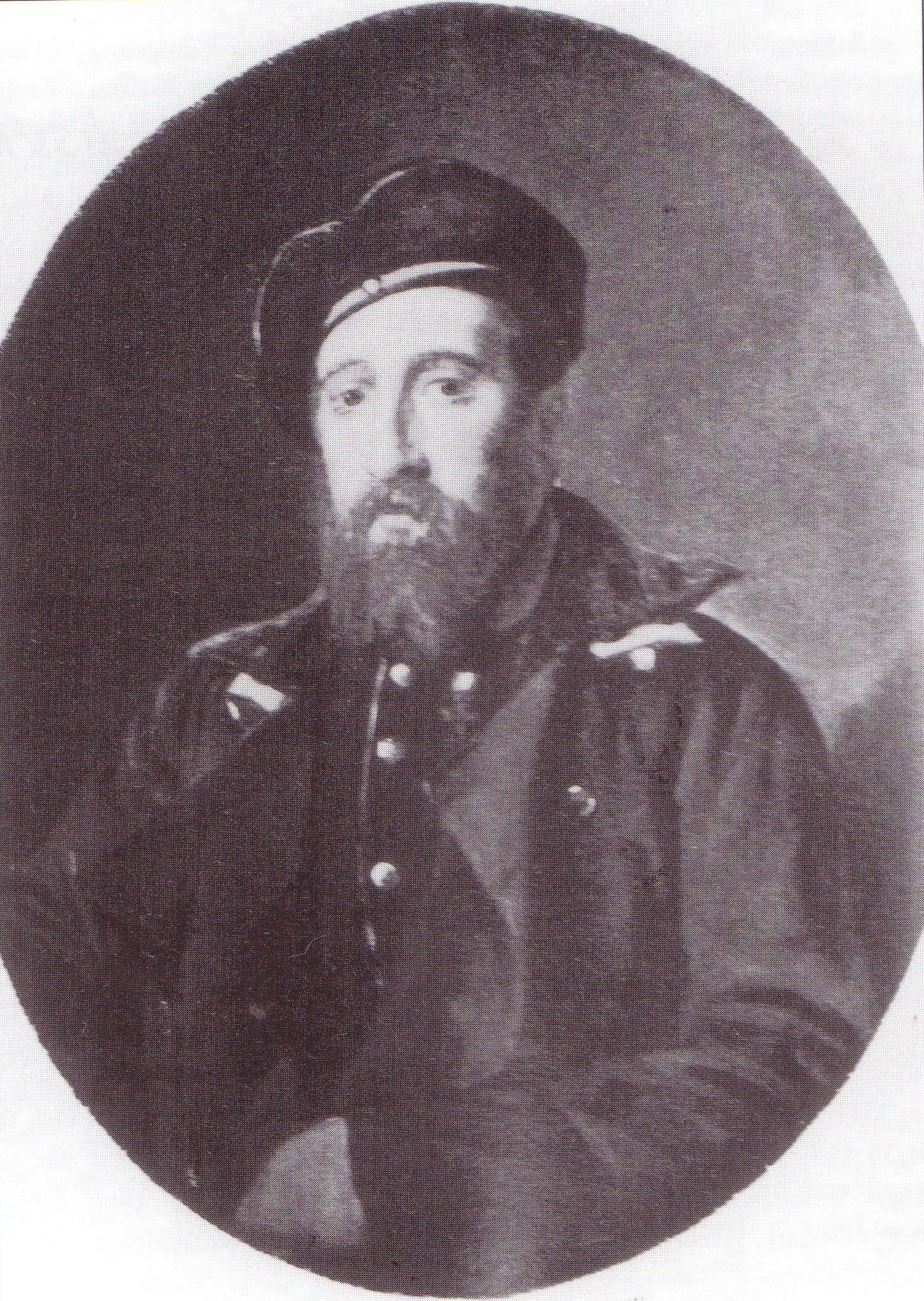
- Born: 25 January 1820
- Died: 28 March 1871 (aged 51)

Adelbert Heinrich Graf von Baudissin (born 25 January 1820 in Horsens, Jutland, died 28 March 1871 in Wiesbaden) was a German writer.

== Works ==
- There and there. Loose leaves from a human life. Hanover, Rümpler 1862
- History of the Schleswig-Holstein War. Hanover 1862. 751 p. Digitized
- Christian VII and his court. Historical novel. Hanover, Rümpler (no year) 1863
- The Burk family. Your deeds, dreams and thoughts. Recorded by AHv Baudissin, in 3 volumes. Hanover, Rümpler 1863 (vol. 1, 237 p .; vol. 2, 226 p .; vol. 3 oA)
- Schleswig-Holstein soldier stories. Hanover, Rümpler 1863. 127 p.
- Philippine Welser or three hundred years ago. Novel. Hanover, Rümpler (no year) 1864
- Schleswig-Holstein wrapped around the sea. Pictures of war and peace from 1864. Stuttgart, Hallberger 1865, 371 pages (reprint. Kiel, Schramm 1978, 371 pages)
- Look into the future of the North Frisian Islands and the Schleswig mainland coast. Schleswig, Spethmann 1867. 101 pages
- The manuscript found, or my name is Scholtz, comedy in an elevator. Schleswig, Deaf and Dumb - Inst., 1867. 34 p.
