= Lake Elbert =

Lake in the state of Florida, United States

- Location within Florida Location within the United States
- Location: Winter Haven, Florida
- Coordinates: 28°01′37″N 81°42′33″W
- Type: natural freshwater lake
- Basin countries: United States
- Max. length: 3,955 feet (1,205 m)
- Max. width: 2,635 feet (803 m)
- Surface area: 172 acres (70 ha)
- Surface elevation: 135 feet (41 m)
- Islands: 10 to 12, all of which are near shore, swamplike and small

Lake Elbert is a circular lake with a circular cove on its southwest side. The Polk County Water Atlas says it is sometimes known as Little Elbert, but no other sources have used this name. Lake Elbert is a natural freshwater lake with a 172-acre (700,000 m^{2}) surface area. It has ten to twelve mostly very small islands, all near shore. The largest, on the south side, is about 150 feet (46 m) long and about 75 feet (23 m) wide. It is entirely surrounded by Lake Elbert Drive. On the south side of the lake, Lake Elbert Drive is a major thoroughfare linking up on the southwest with Central Avenue and on the southeast with Dundee Road. Across the street from the lake is mostly residential housing. A small section on the southwest has two medical offices and on the northwest the lake adjoins Polk State College.

There are no public swimming areas on Lake Elbert. The public, however, has access to the lake at several points on the shore. A public boat ramp is located adjacent to Polk State College. Fishing is allowed on the lake. The Hook and Bullet website says Lake Elbert contains largemouth bass, bluegill and crappie.
