= Elbert H. Smith =

American poet

Elbert Herring Smith was the author of the best selling epic poem Ma-ka-tai-me-she-kia-kiak in 1846. Smith was referred to as "The Wisconsin Bard", and his Ma-ka-tai-me-she-kia-kiak is considered the first volume of poetry printed in Wisconsin. The first edition was published in Milwaukee credited to "a Western Tourist" with editions under Smith's name published in New York in 1848 and 1849.
