= Elbert H. Parsons Law Library =

- May and Cooney Dry Goods Company
- U.S. National Register of Historic Places
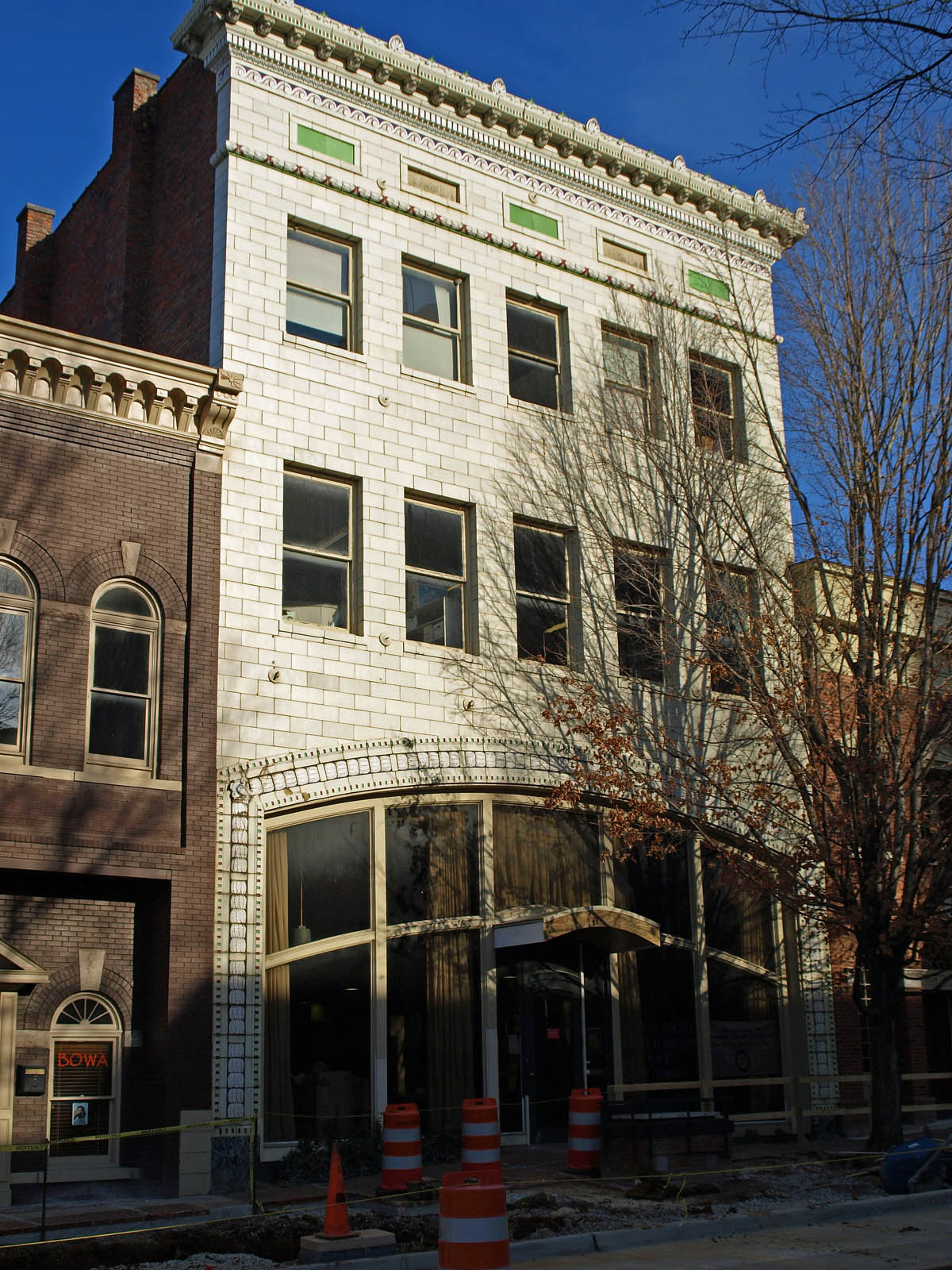
- The building in December 2009

- Location within Huntsville, Alabama Location within Alabama Location within the United States
- Location: 205 E. Side Sq., Huntsville, Alabama
- Coordinates: 34°43′51″N 86°35′5″W
- Area: less than one acre
- Built: 1913
- Architect: Edgar L. Love (original); Harvie Jones (renovation)
- MPS: Downtown Huntsville MRA
- NRHP reference No.: 80000720
- Added to NRHP: September 22, 1980

The Elbert H. Parsons Law Library (also known as the May and Cooney Dry Goods Company Building) is a historic commercial building in Huntsville, Alabama. The person for whom the building was ultimately named, Elbert H. Parsons (1907–1968), was a Huntsville-based judge of the Alabama Circuit Court.

In 1973, it was purchased by the county and renovated to house a public law library.

== History ==
The Elbert H. Parsons Law Library was built in 1913 by May and Cooney Dry Goods in Huntsville, Alabama. Named after Elbert H. Parsons, who was a Huntsville-based judge of the Alabama Circuit Court, the building was constructed to replace the company's previous building which was destroyed by a fire in 1911.

The building is a three-story structure with the façade faced in white glazed terra cotta. The street level has a large arch, decorated with a line of bay leaf clusters surrounded by alternating green and red blocks. The inside of the arch was converted from a storefront to large glass panes with a single central entrance in the 1973 renovation. The second and third floors each have five one-over-one sash windows, with the third floor windows slightly smaller than the second. The building is topped with a projecting course of bay leaf garlands, a set of five colored panels in line with the windows, and a corbeled cornice with several rows of geometric designs.

J. C. Penney moved into the building in 1934 and remained until 1966, when it moved to "The Mall" on University Drive. The store occupied the building until 1931, when they went bankrupt due to the Great Depression.

In 1973, it was purchased by the county and renovated to house a public law library.

The building was listed on the National Register of Historic Places in 1980.
