= Adelbert Delbrück =

German banker and businessman (1822–1890)

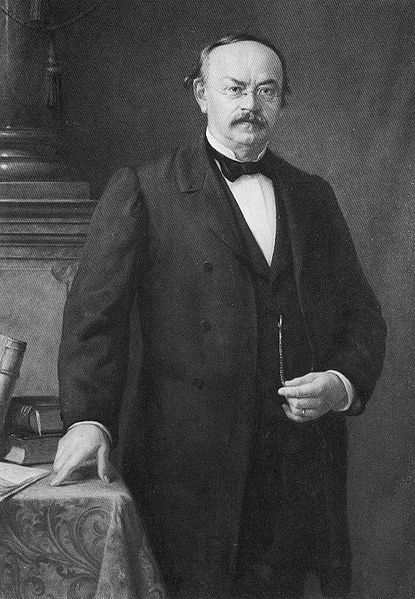
- Delbrück in 1882
- Born: 16 January 1822; Magdeburg, Kingdom of Prussia
- Died: 26 May 1890 (aged 68); Kreuzlingen, Kingdom of Prussia, German Empire
- Occupation(s): Banker, businessman

Gottlieb Adelbert Delbrück (German pronunciation: [ˈaːdl̩bɛʁt ˈdɛl.bʁʏk]; 15 January 1822 – 26 May 1890) was a German banker and businessman.

== Early life ==
Delbrück was born on 16 January 1822 in Magdeburg, Kingdom of Prussia, to Gottlieb Delbrück (1777–1842) who worked in Magdeburg. Delbrück studied Lutheran theology and law. After graduating, he worked as a lawyer.

== Career ==
In 1854, he founded Delbrück Leo & Co. In 1870, Delbrück was a co-founder of German company Deutsche Bank. From 1870 to 1875, Delbrück he was member of Vorstand in Association of German Chambers of Industry and Commerce. Delbrück was member of German Progress Party. Delbrück was married with Luise Jonas (1831–1922). His son Ludwig Delbrück (1860–1913) became leader of company Bank Delbrück Leo & Co..

== Death and legacy ==
Delbrück died on 26 May 1890, in Kreuzlingen, Kingdom of Prussia, aged 68. He was buried in the Berlin Cemetery III of the Jerusalem and New Church in front of the Halleschen Tor. His final resting place is the neoclassical wall tomb of his family. Built of sandstone ashlars, the three-axis structure with red granite inscription plaques has a lattice enclosure. By decision of the Berlin Senate, Adelbert Delbrück's final resting place (Field 331-EB-3) has been dedicated as an honorary grave of the State of Berlin, since 1992. The dedication was extended in 2016 for the usual period of twenty years.

== Literature ==
- Hans-Henning Zabel (1957). "Delbrück, Gottlieb Adelbert". Neue Deutsche Biographie (in German). Vol. 3. Berlin: Duncker & Humblot. pp. 576–577. (full text online).
