= Adalbert László Arany =

Slovak Hungarian linguist (1909–1967)

Adalbert László Arany (Slovak: L. Albert Arany; 19 September 1909 – 13 October 1967) was a Slovak Hungarian linguist, teacher, ethnographer and museum director. He was one of the founders of Slovak dialect research.

== Life ==
Arany was born in Betlér on 19 September 1909. He graduated from high school in Rozsnyó and studied Slovak linguistics and philosophy at Comenius University in Bratislava. He received his doctorate in 1937 and was a teacher at the Hungarian grammar school in Bratislava for many years. From 1937, as the head of the Hungarian committee of the Šafárik Scholars' Society, which was attached to the linguistics section, he directed the collection of Hungarian dialects in Slovakia. From 1943 to 1946 he was a researcher at the Slovak Academy of Sciences. In 1946 he was dismissed from his post because of his Hungarian nationality.

In 1947 he joined the Hungarian Democratic People's Association of Czechoslovakia. In 1949 he was arrested and sentenced to 8 years of hard labour. He was released by presidential amnesty in 1955. From 1955 to 1958 he was director of the District Museum in Rozsnyo, from 1958 he worked as a physical worker in Bratislava, then moved back to Rozsnyó because of a serious illness in a labour camp. In his last years he resumed his linguistic research. Together with Jozef Orlovský, he wrote the first structuralist grammar book in Slovak. He also worked on the ethnography of the Hungarians in Slovakia. His legacy was preserved by his family and later by Ferenc Ambrus. It was during the processing of this collection that the ballad collection he had collected with his students during World War II was rediscovered.

Arany died in Rozsnyó on 13 October 1967 at the age of 58. A memorial plaque was built in the village of Kolon in Slovakia.

== Works ==
- 1936 Zprávy o dialektologických štúdiách v Gemeri a v doline Slanskej. Nárečia Slanskej doliny. Carpatica I-a, 34-–70.
- 1938 Maďarské jazykové vplyvy v západoslovenských nárečiach. Pozsony, doktori értekezés.
- 1939 Zpráva o činnosti maďarskej komisie jaz. odboru USŠ a členov maďarského seminára Univerzity Komenského v Bratislave. Carpatica 2, řada A, 96–107.
- 1940 Psychologické základy javov bilingvistických. Linguistica Slovaca I-II, 39-–52.
- 1940 Magyar népnyelv. Linguistica Slovaca I-II, 377.
- 1940 Striednice typu ä, á v nárečí nižnoslanskom. Sborník Matice slovenskej 1. Jazykoveda XVIII/1-2, 17–25.
- 1941 Magyarság, népdal és népviselet. In: Császár István (Szerk.): A Toldy Kör irodalmi évkönyve 1941. Pozsony, 33-–42.
- 1941 A szlovákiai magyarság néprajza. Bratislava.
- 1944 Kolon nyelvjárásának fonológiai rendszere. Bevezetés a szerkezeti nyelvjárástanba. Pozsony.
- 1946 Gramatika jazyka slovenského. Bratislava. (tsz. Jozef Orlovský)
- 1947 K porovnávaciemu jazykovému výskumu na Slovensku. Jazykovedný sborník 12, 389–422.
- 1957 Régi bányászatunk kezdete Rozsnyón. Bányász Szó VII, 59.
- 1958 Csucsom bányászati története. Bányász Szó VIII, 36.
- 1958 Berzéte mint bányahely. Bányász Szó VIII, 10-11.
- 1967 The Phonological System of a Hungarian Dialect = Kolon nyelvjárásának fonológiai rendszere. Bloomington.
- 1967 Trubetzkoy nyelvelméletének és fonológiájának lélektani és logikai alapja. I-II. Nyelvtudományi Közlemények, LXIX/1-2.
- Az ősmagyar nyelv szerkezetrendje és érvénytelenítése. Nyelvtudományi Értekezések 58, 67-70.
- 1967 Axiomatische Probleme der Phonologie. Wiener Slavistisches Jahrbuch, Ergänzungsband VI, 382–385.
- 1967 Ausgewählte schriften von Gyula Laziczius. Ural-Altaische Jahrbücher 39, 264–266.
- 1968 Das system der finnisch-ungrischen und der urmadjarischen Sprache. Acta Linguistica, 17–23.
- 1969 Das Finnougrische und das Urungarische in der eurasischen Lautlandschaft.
- 1986 A szlovákiai magyarság néprajza. In: Turczel Lajos (szerk.): Ének az éjben. Szlovákiai magyar írók 1939-1945. Bratislava, 277-–289.
- 1990 A szlovákiai magyarság néprajza. Rozsnyó.
- 1990 A bilingvis jelenségek pszichológiai alapjai. Regio 1/ 1, 96–111. (Ford. Svoboda Róbert)
- 1998 A kétnyelvűség jelenségeinek pszichológiai alapjai. In: Tanulmányok a magyar-szlovák kétnyelvűségről. Pozsony, 7–31. (Ford. Zeman László)
- A bal szélső (Kézirat). Fórum Kisebbségkutató Intézet, Bibliotheca Hungarica, Somorja.
- Liszka József (Szerk.) 2009: Nyitra vidéki népballadák (Arany A. László hagyatékából). Somorja.
