= Aldebert (disambiguation) =

Aldebert, or Adalbert, was a preacher in 8th century Gaul.

Aldebert may also refer to:

- Aldebert de Chambrun (1821–1899), French politician
- Aldebert de Chambrun (1872–1962), French general
- Henri Aldebert (1880–1961), French bobsledder
- Hildebert (c. 1055–1133), French bishop and theologian also known as Aldebert

== See also ==
- Adelbert (disambiguation)
