= Adelbert Niemeyer =

German painter

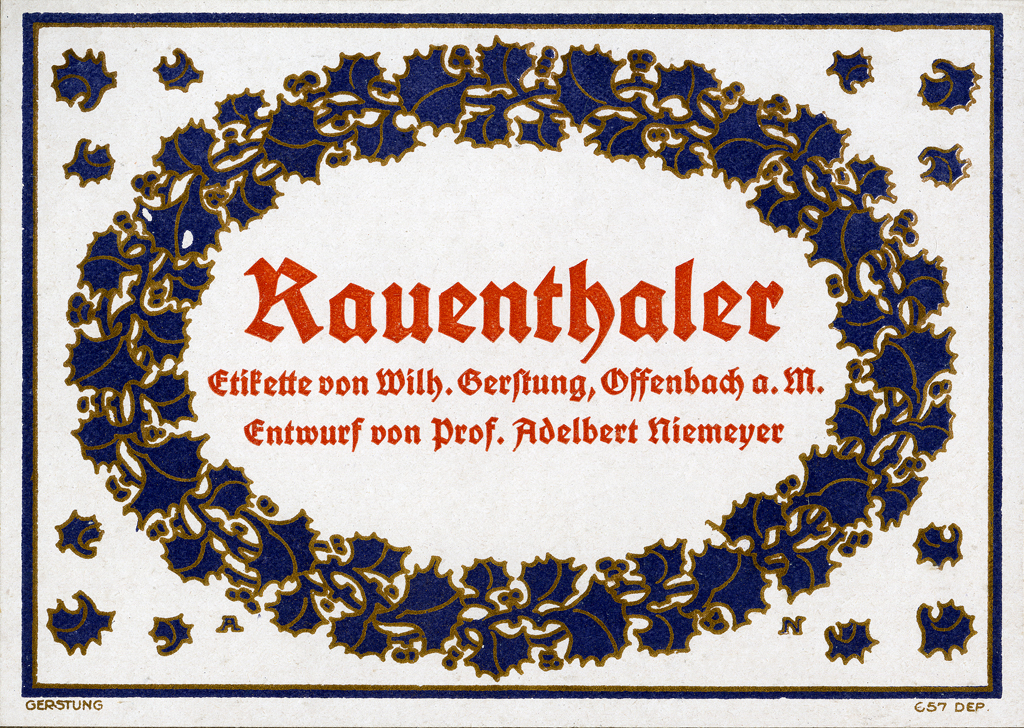
Winelabel, designed by Niemeyer

Adelbert Hans Gustav Niemeyer (1867–1932) was a German painter, craftsman and architect.
