= Wandelbert =

Wandelbert or Wandalbert may refer to:

- Wandalbert (duke) (c. 600 – after 643), Frankish nobleman
- Wandelbert of Farfa, abbot between 757 and 761
- Wandalbert of Prüm (c. 813 – c. 850), Benedictine monk and writer
