= Child art =

Art made by children

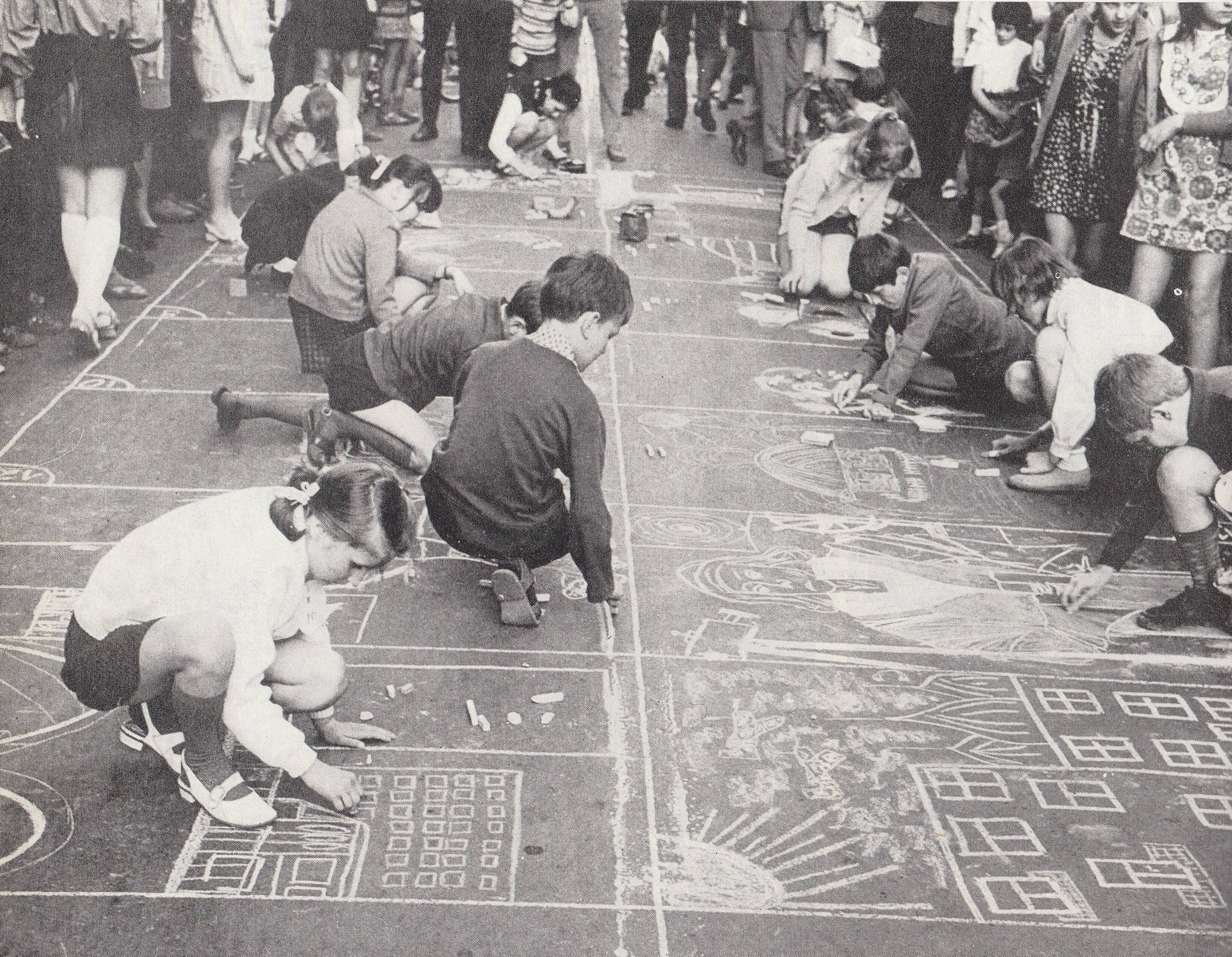
Polish children street painting

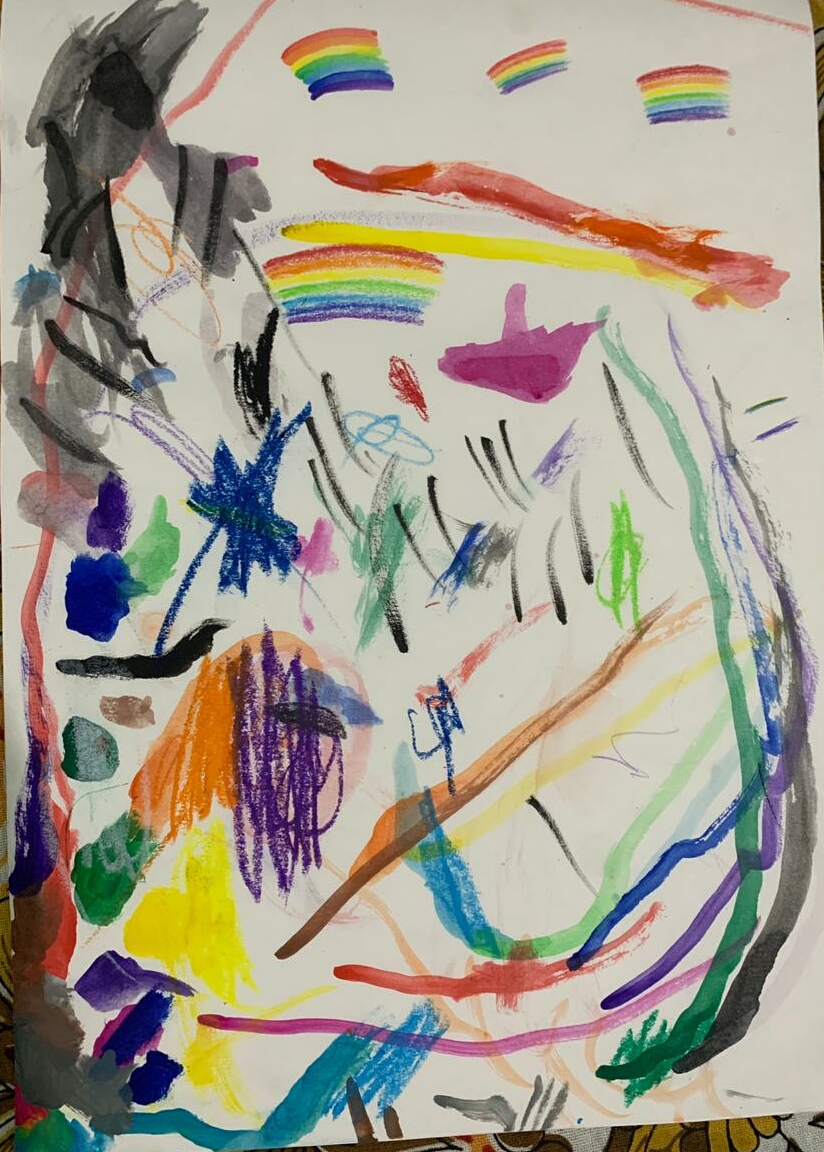
Art by a three-year-old girl

Child art is drawings, paintings, or other artistic works created by children. It has been used as a therapeutic tool by psychologists and as an ethnographic tool to further understand children of the past. Within developmental theory, the art of each child reflects their level of self-awareness and the degree to which they are integrated with their environment.

== Meanings ==
In its primary sense, the term was created by Franz Cižek (1865–1946) in the 1890s. The following usages denote and connote different, sometimes parallel meanings:

- In the world of contemporary fine art, "child art" refers to a subgenre of artists who depict children in their works;
- "child art" implies art intended for viewing by children – illustrations perhaps in a book for juvenile readers, done by a child or by a professional adult illustrator;
- as a synonym for juvenilia.

== History ==
J.-J. Rousseau (1712–78), J.H. Pestalozzi (1746–1827), John Ruskin (1819–1900), and Herbert Spencer (1820–1903) laid the premises for understanding the importance of art for children.

Agenda of art education for children was discussed at the International Conference of 1884, held in London at the Health Exhibition. The discussion framework was largely shaped by the widespread of schools of design for professional training of children and youth in the UK, beginning from 1852. Some of the conference participants underlined the importance of creativity, imaginations and special methodology for development of children's artistic skills. Ebenezer Cooke (1837–1913) has pointed out that "if a child follows its bent and draws animals its own way, in action, and repeats them, outlines them, and colours them too, he will produce a drawing which may be comparable to the archaic period of more than one historic school". The proceedings of the conference, ed. by E. Cooke, were issued in the 1885–86 Journal of Education, published by the Society for the Development of the Science of Education.

Robert Ablett (1848–1945) organized the first European exhibition of drawings by children in London, 1890. The first collection of 1250 children's drawing and sculpture pieces was assembled by Corrado Ricci (1858–1934), an Italian art historian.

Between 1895 and 1920, Franz Cižek championed the concept and practice of children's art in his art school, refusing to impose an aesthetic style on his students. At the International Conference on Education organized on the sidelines of the International Health Exhibition of 1884, the educator Ebenezer Cooke praised the practice of free drawing in children, as opposed to classical teaching, stating that it was a natural way for them to express themselves.

Aesthetic appreciation of children's art as untainted by adult influence was extolled by Franz Cižek, who called a child's drawing "a marvelous and precious document". Discovery of the aesthetic quality of the unskilled visual expression by children was related to the aesthetics of modernism and, in case of Cižek, to the Vienna Secession.

In 1897, Cižek opened the Juvenile Art Class, a weekend school upholding children creativity uninhibited by adult vocational standards. The initiative was supported by his Secession friends-artists and opposed by the traditional art teachers. The Class accepted pupils of 2 to 14 years old for two hours a week, free of charge, with no selection. Cižek claimed that he was working "as an artist, not as a teacher", and actually "learned and not taught". The work propagated the theory of developmental stages.

Psychologists' interest in children's art was reflected in works by Georg Kerschensteiner (Die Entwickelung der Zeichnerischen Begabung, 1905, on the grounds of analysis of some 100,000 drawings), Georges-Henri Luquet (Les Dessins D'un Enfant, 1912, using 1500 drawings of the author's daughter from 3 to 8 years old), Georges Rouma (Le Langage Graphique de l'Enfant, Paris, 1913), Karl Bühler (1918 ff.), Florence Goodenough, Helga Eng, Robert Coles. According to D.D. Kelly, consequent domination of Piagetian theory of cognitive psychology largely marginalized the psychological studies of children's art, which were revitalized only towards the end of the 20th century.

== Stages of child art ==
As the child develops, their art passes through a number of stages. Four of them were for the first time defined by E. Cooke, under influence of Herbert Spencer's evolutionary theory.

Presently, the stages are generally differentiated as follows:

=== Scribbling ===
A child scribbling

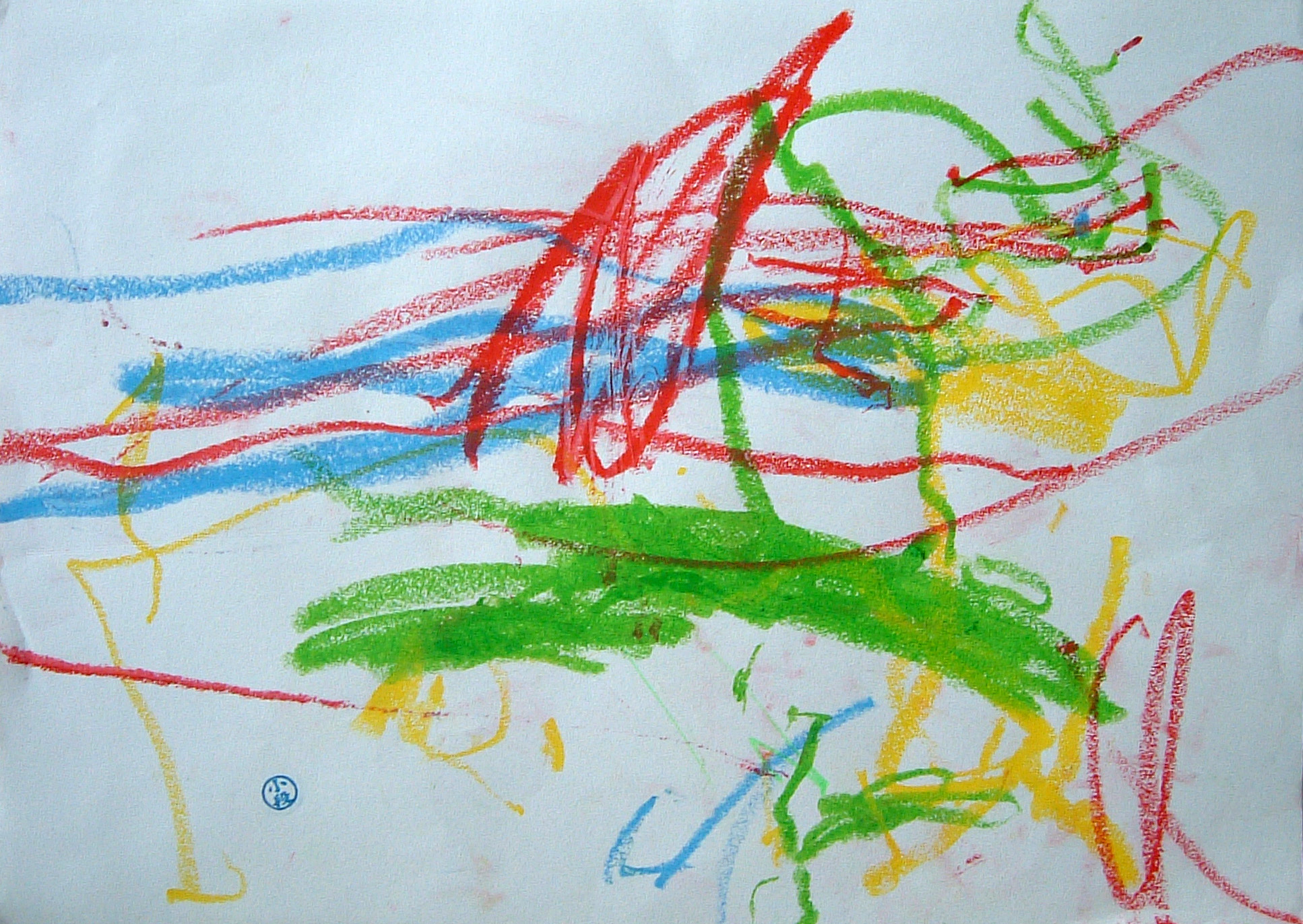
Scribble by one-year-old.

From about their first birthday children achieve the fine motor control to handle a crayon. At first they scribble. The youngest child scribbles with a series of left and right motions, later up, down and then circular motions are added. The child appears to get considerable pleasure from watching the line or the colours appear. Often however children do not pay attention to the edges of the page and the lines go beyond the confines of the page. Children are often also interested in body painting and, given the opportunity, will draw on their hands or smear paint on their faces.

Later, from about their second birthday, controlled scribbling starts. Children produce patterns of simple shapes: circles, crosses and star-bursts. They also become interested in arrangement and can produce simple collages of coloured paper, or place stones in patterns. Once children have established controlled scribbling they begin to name their scribbles.

=== Pre-symbolism ===
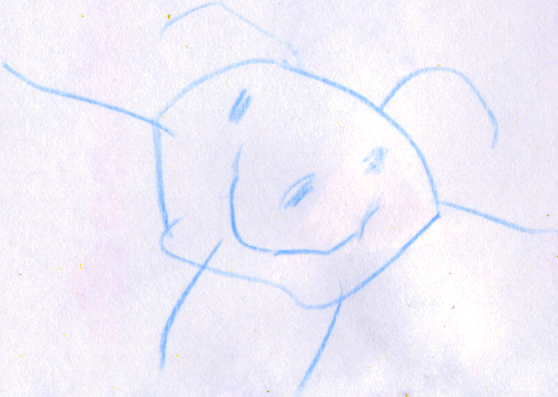
Smiling tadpole person (combined head and body), age 4 1/2

From about age three, the child begins to combine circles and lines to make simple figures. At first, people are drawn without a body and with limbs emerging directly from the head. The eyes are often drawn large, filling up most of the face, and hands and feet are omitted. At this stage it may be impossible to identify the subject of the art without the child's help.

Later drawings from this stage show figures drawn floating in space and sized to reflect the child's view of their importance. Most children at this age are not concerned with producing a realistic picture.

=== Symbolism ===
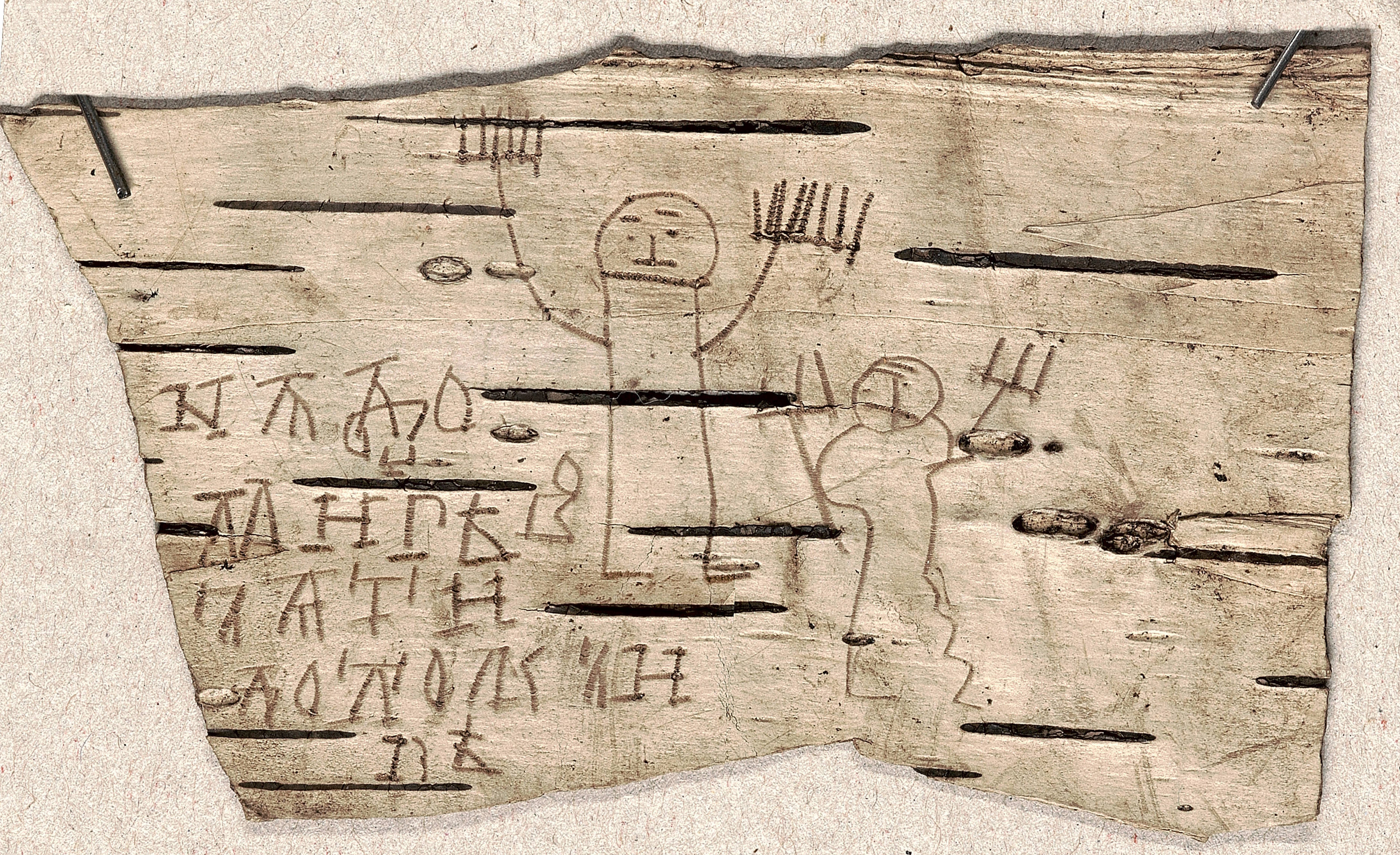
Birch bark document 202, showing symbolic drawing of people, age 6–7 (Onfim)

In this stage of a child's development, they create a vocabulary of images. Thus when a child draws a picture of a cat, they will always draw the same basic image, perhaps modified (one cat has stripes while another has dots, for example). This stage of drawing begins at around age five. The basic shapes are called symbols or schema.

Each child develops their own set of symbols, which are based on their understanding of what is being drawn rather than on observation. Each child's symbols are therefore unique to the child. By this age, most children develop a "person" symbol which has a properly defined head, trunk and limbs which are in some sort of rough proportion.

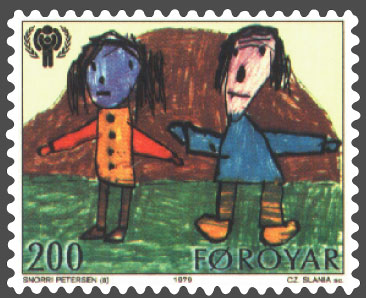
Two schematic figures on a green base line

Before this stage the objects that child would draw would appear to float in space, but at about five to six years old the child introduces a baseline with which to organize their space. This baseline is often a green line (representing grass) at the bottom of the paper. The figures stand on this line. Slightly older children may also add secondary baselines for background objects and a skyline to hold the sun and clouds.

It is at this stage that cultural influences become more important. Children not only draw from life, but also copy images in their surroundings. They may draw copies of cartoons. Children also become more aware of the story-telling possibilities in a picture. The earliest understanding of a more realistic representation of space, such as using perspective, usually comes from copying.

=== Realism ===
As children mature they begin to find their symbols limiting. They realize that their schema for a person is not flexible enough, and does not resemble the real thing. At this stage, which begins at nine or ten years old, the child will lend greater importance to whether the drawing looks like the object being drawn. Around the age of nine or ten, many children develop a heightened visual awareness of their surroundings. They become more attentive to details and proportions in their drawings, often adding features like lips, fingernails, hairstyles, and joints when depicting people. Additionally, they show a growing interest in illustrating people in dynamic poses and various costumes. This can be a frustrating time for some children, as their aspirations outstrip their abilities and knowledge. Some children give up on drawing almost entirely. However, others become skilled, and it is at this stage that formal artistic training can benefit the child most. The baseline is dropped and the child can learn to use rules such as perspective to organize space better. Story-telling also becomes more refined and children will start to use formal devices such as the comic strip.

== Therapeutic ==
Art therapy can be an effective way for children to develop and connect with their emotions. Some autistic children have found that drawing can help them to express feelings that they have difficulty expressing otherwise. Similarly, children who have faced horrors such as war can find it difficult to talk about what they have experienced directly. The Chapman Art Therapy Treatment Intervention, for example, was designed in 2001 to help children exhibiting PTSD symptoms. "Mess-making" is another form of art therapy where children are permitted to paint outside of the confines of a canvas, often spilling and destroying materials. This treatment was used primarily on survivors of sexual violence. Art can help children come to terms with their emotions in these situations.

The New York City Board of Education noted that following 9/11, schoolchildren exhibited PTSD symptoms at a rate five times higher than usual. Art therapists could gain insight into children's concerns about their family, pets, and friends, often asking whether the crisis was truly over or if more danger was imminent. Marygrace Berberian, who developed art therapy programs throughout New York City and facilitated the World Trade Center Children's Mural Project (WTCCMP), emphasized the power of artistic expression in addressing this collective trauma. She described the nearly insurmountable grief that enveloped the community, noting, "artistic expression immediately alleviated the pain of a community struggling to make sense of an illogical sequence of events". The WTCCMP provided children an opportunity to participate in a healing process, contributing to a montage of 3,100 self-portraits from around the world. It became crucial for these vulnerable children to feel a sense of control and calm by the end of each therapeutic activity.

The first art therapist to specialize in children was Edith Kramer, who practiced throughout the 1940s. Influenced by Franz Cižek, she believed that a child's art reflected their "natural" development and thus mitigated the negative influences of society.

== Criticism ==
After visiting a children's art display in San Francisco in the 1980s, educator John Holt stated that, "...An understanding of adultism might begin to explain what I mean when I say that much of what is known as children's art is an adult invention." Child art, as a concept, has been philosophically critiqued due to its framing as an adult invention that romanticized children's artistic creations as being free from external influences, such as social norms and expectations. Generally, this has been argued as limiting the full understanding of the depth of children's art and the cultural, historical, political and social differences they have. From an aesthetic perspective, traditional opinions of child art have been critiqued for using adult art as the only framework for judging the technical skills of children's art rather than understanding it as a unique form of communication. Compared to Franz Cižek's traditional view of child art, other critics highlight the importance of viewing child art as expressions encoded with social meaning.

Varying viewpoints of child art and how it should be judged have evolved over time. Early views of child art were separated into two categories: those who critiqued it based on what it could explain about the psychological development of children and those who critiqued it based on what it could explain about the development of art itself. Early judges of child art did not view child artists as distinct from adult artists, instead, they saw them as imitators which led their art to be seen as less valuable than that of adults. From a technical and skill standpoint, child art was valued when it resembled art created by adults. Later in the 18th and 19th centuries, the romanticization of children and of childhood as a state of being led critics to view child art as more pure artistic expressions than adult art. As a result, child art was beginning to be understood as distinct from adult art. Moving into the 20th century, art education was more considerate of the aesthetic and social value of child art as both a form of expression and a tool for development. Art education then took a less technically and stylistically strict approach so as to allow for further creativity and flexibility. Contemporary viewpoints on child art have incorporated the importance of understanding child art as being influenced by their cultural, social and political environments. However, art education is still argued to be between two schools of thought: child art as needing to be uninhibited and child art as needing some enforced structure to help refine children's technical skills.

== Reliability ==
The reliability of children's art as evidence of their experiences is a matter of professional debate. In recent years, courts around the world have become increasingly accepting of children's art being submitted as evidence. In 2004, the International Criminal Court accepted a group of approximately 500 children's drawings as evidence during investigations of crimes against humanity committed during the War in Darfur. Archaeological records, more specifically finger paintings created by children, dating back to the Neolithic period have been used as points of reference for understanding the historical period and the era's pedagogical processes for teaching art. These finger paintings also indicated how children of the time communicated with adults, their activities and how they interacted with their environments.

Additionally, children's artwork is often used as evidence in prosecuting private crimes where physical evidence may be unavailable, such as cases involving sexual, emotional, or physical abuse. While it was once a widely held belief that children's memories were less reliable than those of adults, the 1970s marked a shift as child advocacy professionals began to argue that memories of traumatic events in young children are generally accurate and can serve as exceptions to the idea that children are too prone to false memories to be dependable witnesses. Further, in both clinical and legal settings, the Family Drawing Test is one of the most widely used projective techniques. This method uses children's drawings to assess their family dynamics and attachment patterns, employing a structured scoring system for evaluation.

=== Children's art as historical evidence ===
Children's art is also a valued source for historians seeking to understand children's lives in the past. In some instances, children's art can provide insight into their experiences. In 1945, the Swiss Red Cross encouraged children liberated from Auschwitz to draw pictures. Some of those drawings have been used by historian Nicholas Stargardt to construct Jewish children's experiences in concentration camps. Historian Jack Hodgson argues that children's art will always come with ambiguity owing to the "need to interpret them" and that is often off-putting to discipline that remains logocentric, "thriving on precise textual details". However, Hodgson advocates for their use due to "enormous communicative potential", particularly regarding "unquantifiable feelings or emotions".

Some of the earliest forms of child art discovered to date have been uncovered in Sulawesi (Indonesia) and El Castillo (Spain), where archaeologists uncovered the hand imprints of children dating to around 40,000 years ago. These artistic imprints are known as parietal art, meaning that they are counted as "paintings, drawings and engravings on immobile rock surfaces". However, recent research has uncovered a number of hand and foot imprints in Quesang within the Tibetan Plateau, and have been attributed to children due to their size. The rock deposits, or travertines, upon which the imprints were found date back to between ~169 and 226 ka BP (before present), leading them to be the oldest examples of parietal art found to date. Although there remains debate on what counts as art, these imprints provide the earliest known proof of humans in the High Tibetan Plateau. Further ancient child art has also been found in one of the most famous archaeological sites in the world, Pompeii. In 2024, Pompeii's archaeological officials reported that children's paintings of hunters, animals and gladiators had been uncovered in the insula dei Casti Amanti in Pompeii's Via dell'Abbondanza within the second colonnaded Cenacle's home. These paintings have been dated to before the eruption of Mount Vesuvius in 79 AD. Gabriel Zuchtriegel, the director of Pompeii's archaeological park, explained that these paintings have been found to be based on scenes the child artist has directly witnessed rather than from imagination. He explained that they had probably "witnessed fights in the amphitheatre, thus coming into contact with an extreme form of spectacularised violence" and that the paintings pointed to "the impact of this on the imagination of a young boy or girl, subject to the same stages of development that are still found today... it is an anthropological constant that is independent of artistic and cultural fashions."

== Famous child artists ==
While child art is largely recognized as the artistic expression of all children, some well-known artists painted their first works of art and began their careers in their youth.

=== Historical artists recognized in childhood ===
Angelica Kauffman became known for her prodigious art as a painter and a singer in her childhood. She had been commissioned to paint portraits for various members of the religious and noble elite by the time she was 11 years old. She later painted a well recognized self-portrait of herself holding sheet music in 1753, at the age of 12 or 13, showcasing her abilities both in art and music.

Pablo Picasso painted his first oil painting, The Little Yellow Picador (1889), at only eight years old. By the age of 13, he painted two works of art while living in A Coruña, Spain: The Barefoot Girl (1895) and Man with a Cap (1895).

Edward Hopper painted his first oil painting at the age of 13, titled Rowboat in Rocky Cove (1895). It was recently discovered that this painting was a copy of watercolor artwork from an 1891 issue of The Art Interchange, as well as many of the paintings he completed in his childhood and teenage years.

=== Contemporary child artists ===
Elisabeth Anisimow originally gained recognition for her watercolor paintings when she was seven years old, when her artwork was first showcased in the Children's Museum in Norway. She then began exploring her own adaptation of tableau vivant at the age of nine, as she painted directly onto various props, scenes, and the people within them. In 2018, she reported that her "living paintings" sold for between $2,500 and $5,000.

At the age of seven, Kieron Williamson's art depicting various landscapes of his hometown, Norfolk, England, was exhibited for the first time. This exhibition sold out and brought in around £150,000. He then continued to refine his skills while painting landscapes, while also exploring new imagery, painting "more horses and more people".

Andres Valencia is a young artist from California known for his large, vibrant figurative paintings inspired by Cubism. He started his artistic journey at the age of five, with his talent quickly noticed by his teachers in visual and performing arts. In 2021, he captured the art world's attention as the youngest artist to exhibit at Art Miami, where he sold all 17 of his showcased paintings for a total of 1.3 million USD.

Aelita Andre is an abstract painter whose work was first exhibited in her hometown of Melbourne, when she was only two years old. She found more success throughout her childhood, her paintings being displayed in exhibitions across the globe. In 2016, at the age of nine, she described the inspiration behind her art: how "[her] animals inspire [her], some of [her] movies. [...] Documentaries inspire [her]. The cosmos inspires [her] as well. Because it's a really amazing, magical place."

== See also ==
- Child psychology
- Childhood development of fine motor skills
- Naïve art
- Outsider art
- Poetry by children
- Wang Yani – Chinese artist (born 1975)
