= Baroda Development Screening Test =

- Purpose: motor-mental assessment of infant

Baroda Developmental Screening Test is a screening test for motor-mental assessment of infants, developed from Bayley Scales of Infant Development.

== History ==
The test was developed by Promila Phatak in 1991 at the Department of Child Development, University of Baroda.

== See also ==
- Denver Developmental Screening Test
- Goodenough-Harris Draw-A-Person Test
- Trivandrum Developmental Screening Chart
