= Trivandrum Developmental Screening Chart =

- Purpose: developmental screening test for children

Trivandrum Developmental Screening Test (TDSC) is a developmental screening test for children. It was developed by selecting 17 test items from BSID (Baroda Norms).

== History ==
It was developed and designed at the Child Development Centre, SAT Hospital, Government Medical College, Trivandrum, Kerala in 1991.

== Test ==
It was validated both at the hospital and the community level against the standard Denver Developmental Screening Test.

With a sensitivity of 66.7% and specificity of 78.8%, it can be used even by community level health worker for mass screening and takes around 5 minutes to complete.^{[2]}Includes adequate mental and motor development milestones spread over the first 2 years. Requires only a pencil and a bunch of keys as test items.

== See also ==
- Baroda Development Screening Test
- Denver Developmental Screening Test
- Goodenough–Harris Draw-A-Person Test
