= John Edward Anderson =

John Edward Anderson may refer to:

- John E. Anderson (1917–2011), American businessman
- John Edward Anderson (psychologist) (1893–1966), American psychologist
- J. Edward Anderson (born 1927), American engineer
