= Catharine Cox Miles =

American psychologist (1890–1984)

- Born: Catharine Morris Cox; May 20, 1890; San Jose, California, U.S.
- Died: October 11, 1984 (aged 94); Sandy Spring, Maryland, U.S.
- Education: Stanford University, (PhD, 1925)
- Spouse: Walter Richard Miles
- Scientific career
- Fields: Human intelligence Gender differences
- Workplaces: Central Mental Hygiene Clinic Stanford University Yale University
- Doctoral advisor: Lewis M. Terman

Catharine Morris Cox Miles (May 20, 1890 – October 11, 1984) was an American psychologist known for her work on intelligence and genius. Born in San Jose, CA, to Lydia Shipley Bean and Charles Ellwood Cox. In 1927 she married psychologist Walter Richard Miles. Her sister was classics scholar and Quaker administrator Anna Cox Brinton.

She was a professor of clinical psychology at the Yale Medical School and affiliated with Yale's Institute of Human Relations. Earlier she worked at Stanford with Stanford-Binet creator Lewis Terman in issues related to IQ. She is also known for her historiometric study (1926) of IQ estimates of three hundred prominent figures who lived prior to IQ testing, a work which was one of the earliest attempts to apply social scientific methods to the study of genius and greatness.

== Academic career ==
Cox attended Stanford University where she earned a Bachelor of Arts degree in 1911. She earned a Master of Arts degree in German language and literature in 1913. Following graduation, she moved to Berlin, Germany, where she spent one year at the University of Jena and the University of Berlin. She returned to San Jose, California, where she taught physical education and German at the College of the Pacific. After World War I, Herbert Hoover was in charge of the American Relief Administration and he encouraged American Quakers to go to Germany to help the struggling country. Cox returned to Germany and joined the American Friends Service Committee in its relief efforts to provide food to starving children who were affected by World War I. By 1920, Cox was serving as the District Director to the American Relief Administration for North-East Germany. Her second visit to Germany is said to have inspired her psychology interests.

Returning to Stanford University to pursue a Ph.D. in psychology under the supervision of Lewis Terman, Cox began her study of geniuses. For her dissertation project, she analyzed the works of 301 geniuses. Using biographical sources, Cox applied the Stanford-Binet Intelligence Scales to assign IQ scores to eminent people from when they were children. She concluded that higher IQ scores and eminence were related for those who worked in the fields of science, literature, and the arts. Military eminence was the only field where she did not find a relationship between childhood IQ and eminence. Cox earned her Ph.D. in 1925. Her dissertation, Early Mental Traits of 300 Geniuses, was published in 1926 as the second volume in the Genetic Studies of Genius series started by Lewis Terman.

After the completion of her degree, Cox embarked a year-long employment with the Central Mental Hygiene Clinic at Cincinnati General Hospital, the Children's Hospital, and the Diagnostic Center of the Veterans Bureau as a psychologist. She then returned to Stanford to continue working with Terman. In 1932, Cox accepted the position of lead clinical psychologist at Yale University, where she worked as a professor in the Psychology and Psychiatry departments. She held this position until retiring in 1953.

== Family life ==
After her year spent in Cincinnati, Cox returned to Stanford to work with Terman in 1927. Cox soon met one of Terman's colleagues, Walter Miles, and the two were married the same year. Miles, a widower, had three teenaged children: Marjorie, Caretta, and Kirk, all of whom Cox-Miles helped raise. They also had two children of their own: a daughter named Anna Mary Miles (Jones), and a son named Charles Ellwood, who died at birth.

== Sex and Personality ==
Cox-Miles and Terman published a book together called Sex and Personality. It has been suggested that it is a book primarily written by Terman, but based on the literature of it, many people think it was actually the work of Cox-Miles with some supervision and assistance from Terman. Cox-Miles was a student of Terman's, but as the process of writing Sex and Personality dragged on, they become more distant from each other and it was a struggle to get it published within their expected time frame. The main research topic of this book was the masculinity-femininity scale, which was tested on many participants to see where they were on the spectrum and how that relates to their personality traits. An argument began between Terman and Cox-Miles around the decision of what the terms "masculine" and "feminine" were to be defined as in the published research.

== Sex differences ==
Cox-Miles and Terman studied the female and the male minds, focusing on the differences and the preferences of each. They argued that the sex differences between female and male minds are heavily controlled by their culture, as opposed to being controlled by biology. While considering gender differences, the two found the greatest difference between the sexes during word association and stimulus modality tasks. Their analysis found that male responses were more superficial and held less significance, while female responses were less indifferent and more cooperative. Cox-Miles and Terman also developed a Masculinity-Femininity test. The test's intended use was to place people on a spectrum that describes how masculine or feminine they were. Terman and Cox-Miles had some very different views on sex differences, which caused a lot of problems with their research publications. They started to disagree, which led to Cox-Miles being overlooked from or not included in some publications. Whole chapters based on her work were even taken out of books because of these disagreements.

A journal article written by Cox-Miles and Terman was published in the American Journal of Psychology, titled "Sex difference in the association of ideas." The team wrote it and performed this research while at Stanford University. The study compared responses of words and interests, and their emotional responses to men and women of different ages. One of the sub-studies stated that there were no differences between girls and boys with their intellectual differences, but girls showed more interest in the social interests and boys showed more interest in activities. The study concludes the differences are largely in part to differences in personality and individual character.

== Intelligence ==
Cox-Miles was also interested in mental speed as function of age. Her way of investigating this was by measuring subjects' intelligence speed scores, using the Otis-S-A Higher Examination speed test. She tested subjects between early adulthood to late adulthood. She found that there is negative correlation between mental age scores and one's biological age, meaning that there is a decline in ability with age. She believed this was due to the influence of a speed factor.

Cox-Miles and Terman published research on achieved eminence together. They looked at adults and how much achievement or recognition they have made in their lifetime. They then took this level of measurement and compared it to their IQ scores to see if there was correlation. There was a very strong belief that mental health, physical health, and intelligence levels would all have a positive correlation to each other. Another of Miles-Cox's studies included a classical cross sectional study that she did with Walter R. Miles, where they tested the relationship between intelligence scores and age, especially from early to late maturity. They found that an increased age is associated with decline of some intellectual abilities, like memory and speed processes. In other words, a decrease in mean IQ is associated with an increase of age after late teens or twenty.

== Legacy ==
Cox-Miles was one of the few prominent female psychologists of her time. She acted as a clinician, a professor, and a researcher; all rare occupations for women before World War II. As opposed to focusing on women's oppression, her writings in Sex and Personality take a more androgynous approach to feminism. She stated that women were capable of being both mothers and professionals, but that society prevented this. Cox-Miles also had a more liberal view of gender and sexuality, which was quite controversial at the time.

== Publications ==
- 1926: Genetic Studies of Genius: The Early Mental Traits of Three Hundred Geniuses
- 1929: "Sex Difference in the Association of Ideas"
- 1931: "The Otis S-A as a Fifteen Minute Intelligence Test"
- 1932: "The Correlation of Intelligence Scores and Chronological Age from Early to Late Maturity"
- 1935: Sex in Social Psychology
- 1936: "Childhood Physical and Mental Health Records of Historical Geniuses"
- 1936: Sex and Personality

== See also ==
- Feminism & Psychology
- Florence Goodenough
- Social hygiene movement
