= Babblarna =

Swedish fictional characters

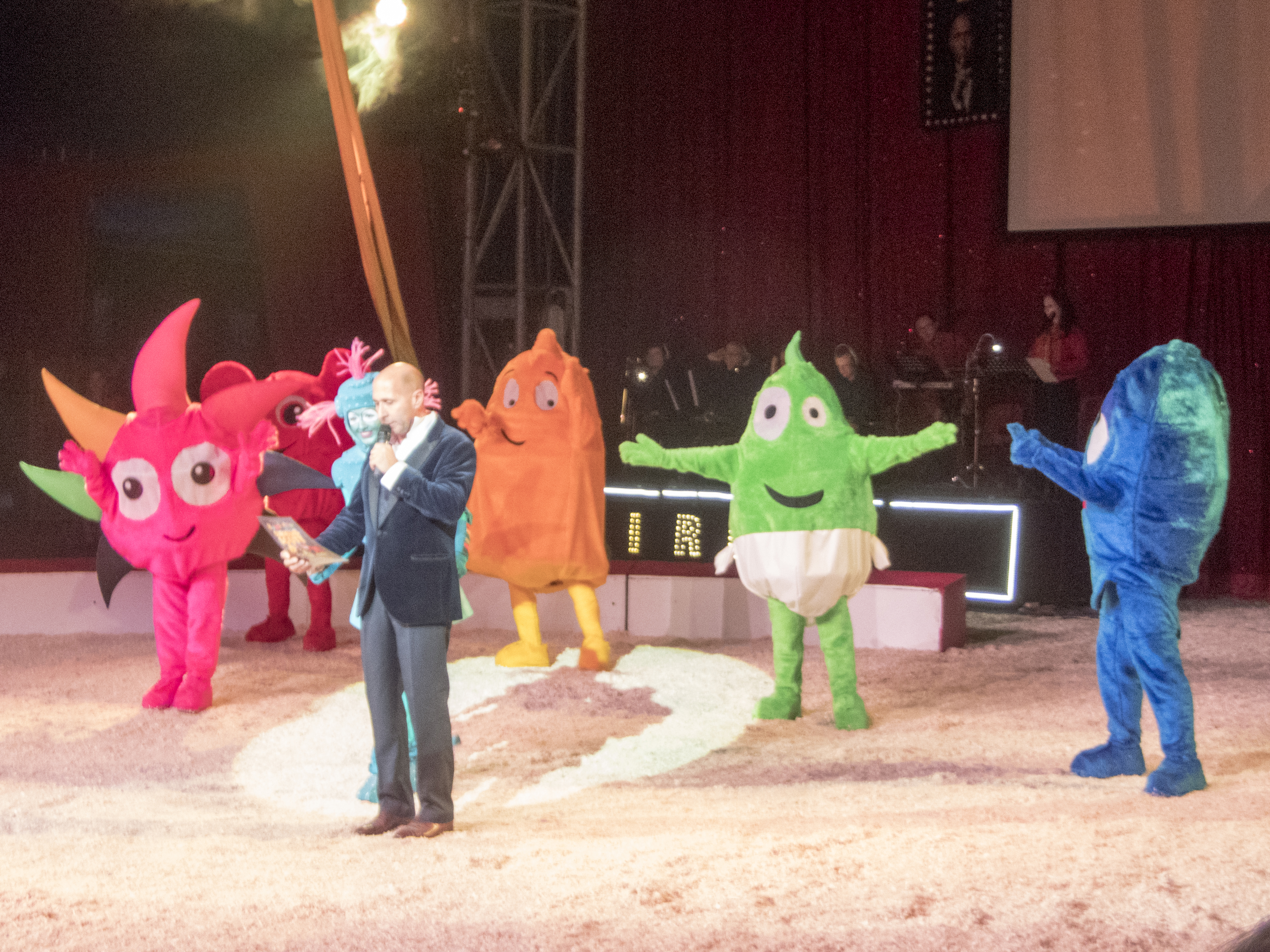
Babblarna at Cirkus Scott

Babblarna (The Babblers) are Swedish fictional characters used as children's language tools, created by illustrator and writer Annelie Tisell. The characters are inspired by professor Irene Johansson and the Karlstadmodel to train people with vocal, language and communication problems. The characters Babba, Bibbi, Bobbo, Dadda, Diddi and Doddo were created in the early 1980s. Babblarna's Youtube channel has over 600 million views. It won a Kristallen award in 2018.

Babblarna also has channels for English, German, Norwegian and Finnish. On the Sverigetopplistan record charts, their children's music album Upp och ner och hit och dit med Babblarna! has peaked at number 23 on the albums chart, and has been certified Platinum. Meanwhile, their song "Babblarnas vaggvisa" has peaked at number 11 on the singles chart, and has been certified 25× Platinum.

== Babblers ==
- Babba is brown, shaped like the number 8, and the only one of the Babblers who is not a tadpole person. She speaks "Ba babba ba ba baaaaa".
- Bibbi is yellow and oblong. He speaks "Bi bibbi bi bi bi".
- Bobbo is red, round and has round, mouse-like ears. She speaks "Bobbo bo bo booo".
- Dadda is green, pear-shaped and wearing a diaper. He speaks "Dadda da da daaa".
- Diddi is pink and round with seven different coloured spikes on his head. Diddi speaks "Diiii diddi di di". He wears a pacifier when he goes to bed. He is the smallest of all the Babblers.
- Doddo is dark blue and heart-shaped. He speaks "Doddo dooo doo do".

The original six Babblers have been supplemented with another six that are alter egos with the aim of providing the opportunity for training several language sounds.

- Gagga has the same shape as Babba but is violet with three lilac spots on their tummy. Gagga speaks "Gagga ga ga ga".
- Giggi has the same shape as Bibbi but is orange. Giggi speaks "Gi gi giggi gi gi".
- Goggo has the same shape as Bobbo but is black. Goggo speaks "Goggo go gooo".
- Sassa has the same shape as Dadda but is light blue. Sassa speaks "Sa sa sa".
- Sissi has the same shape as Diddi but is ice blue. Sissi speaks "Sissi sissi".
- Sosso has the same shape as Doddo but is pink. Sosso speaks "Sooo so so sosso".

== Other characters ==
- Vovvo is a turquoise blue dog that sounds "Vo vo vo".
- Faffa is a parrot that sounds "Fa faffa faaaa".
- Klonk is a blue talking and singing robot girl with pink hair. She is taller than the Babblarna.
- Tut is a talking and singing car that can both drive on the ground and unfold its wings to fly.
- Purrpurr is a whistling cat dragon that lives in the mountains near the Valley of Babblers.
- Pling is a female pink bicycle who only appeared in the song "Stompalång Tut Pling Sång", aka "The Babblarna Stomp-Along Ding-a-Ling Song" in English.

== Discography ==
=== Albums ===
List of albums, with selected peak chart positions and certifications
Title	Album details	Peak chart positions	Certifications
Title	Album details	SWE	Certifications
Upp och ner och hit och dit med Babblarna!	Released: 9 September 2015; Label: Hatten Förlag; Formats: CD, digital download, streaming	23	IFPI SWE: Platinum

=== Singles ===
List of singles, with selected peak chart positions and certifications
Title	Year	Peak chart positions	Certifications	Album
Title	Year	SWE	Certifications	Album
"Babblarnas vaggvisa" (literally meaning "Babblarna's Lullaby")	2017	11	IFPI SWE: 25× Platinum	Non-album single
