= ASQ =

ASQ may refer to:

== Airports and airlines ==
- ExpressJet
- Atlantic Southeast Airlines' ICAO airline code
- International Air Transport Association airport code for Austin Airport, Nevada, United States

== Arts ==
- Alexander String Quartet based at San Francisco State University
- Australian String Quartet

== Questionnaires ==
- Ages & Stages Questionnaires (ASQ), a way to screen infants and young children for developmental delays during the crucial first 5 years of life. See Developmental-Behavioral Screening and Surveillance § Challenges to Early Detection in Primary Care
- Attributional Style Questionnaire, a self-report instrument that yields scores for explanatory style
- Autism Spectrum Quotient, a questionnaire designed to measure autistic traits

== Other ==
- Administrative Science Quarterly, an academic journal on organization studies
- American Society for Quality
- Australia Square, an office and retail complex in the central business district of Sydney, Australia
- Azerbaijani Armed Forces (Azerbaijani: Azərbaycan Silahlı Qüvvələri), the military of Azerbaijan
- Austrian Sign Language (ISO 639-3: asq)
