= Brigance =

Brigance is a surname. Notable people with the surname include:

- Albert Brigance (1932–2007), American author and special education resource specialist
- O. J. Brigance (1969–2026), American football player
- Tom Brigance (1913–1990), American fashion designer

== Fictional characters ==
- Jake Brigance, lawyer in series by author John Grisham
