= Walter Richard Miles =

American psychologist (1885–1978)

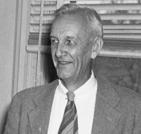
- 1947 at the AAAS
- Born: March 29, 1885; Silverleaf, North Dakota, US
- Died: May 15, 1978 (aged 93); Sandy Spring, Maryland, US
- Education: Pacific College; University of Iowa
- Spouse: Catharine Cox Miles
- Scientific career
- Fields: Psychology
- Workplaces: Stanford University; Yale University
- Doctoral advisor: Carl Seashore
- Doctoral students: Neil Miller; Roger Barker

Walter Richard Miles (March 29, 1885 – May 15, 1978) was an American psychologist and a president of the American Psychological Association (APA). He best known for his development of the two-story rat maze, his research on low dose alcohol, the preservation and study of early Muybridge works, the development of red night vision goggles for aviation pilots, and the reduction of performance in aging individuals. The theme of his academic career was his fascination with apparatuses to measure behavior. C. James Goodwin (2003) noted that Miles "never became a leading figure in any particular area of research in psychology... but drifted from one area to another, with the direction of the drift determined often by the presence of a particular type of apparatus or an apparatus-related problem that intrigued him".

== Early life ==
Born into a Quaker family on March 29, 1885, in Silverleaf, North Dakota. Richard Walter Miles was the son of Thomas Elwood Miles, a farmer and country store owner, and Sarah Caroline Miles. His grandfather, Richard White, was a prosperous farmer in Indiana, but lost everything in the depression of the late 1870s.

== Education ==
In 1901 Miles entered Pacific Academy about 35 miles (56 km) away from home. During his one year here, Miles worked for room and board in the president's house and played football. After graduation, he attended Pacific College in 1902 and graduated as valedictorian in 1906. From 1906 to 1908 he attended Earlham College in Indiana and began working in a small psychology laboratory. It was here he first became interested in laboratory apparatuses as he worked his way through one of Titchener's laboratory manuals in experimental psychology.

After graduating from Earlham, he moved home for the summer before accepting a teaching position in psychology and education at William Penn College in Oskaloosa, Iowa. He was offered $700 a year if married and $600 if not, so he married Elizabeth Mae Kirk and left the next day. While at Penn College, he was recruited by Carl Seashore to attend graduate school at Iowa. While at Iowa, he first earned a master's degree in education and earned money by tutoring and selling insurance, however by the second year Seashore had convinced him to pursue psychology. His dissertation focused on the accuracy of the voice in simple pitch singing and he completed his PhD in psychology in 1913.

== Career ==
=== Wesleyan College/Carnegie Institution (1914–1922) ===
Miles began working as a research scientist at Wesleyan College after receiving his PhD. He was recruited by Raymond Dodge to fill a one-year position here while Dodge left to work with F.G. Benedict at the Carnegie Nutrition Institute. When his year was up, he replaced Dodge at the Carnegie Nutrition Laboratory in Washington, D.C., where he remained until 1922. During his time here, much of his research focused on combined psychological and physiological measurements. His work was heavily influenced by the apparatus and experimental records Dodge had left behind. One notable area of research while at Carnegie was Miles' work on the reaction time of football players in collaboration with his graduate student Bernice Courtney Graves who was better known as B.C. Graves. In line with Miles' love of apparatuses, the two constructed an apparatus to measure the effects of variations in signal calling on the speed at which the lineman moved in reaction to the signal for snapping the ball.

While at the Carnegie Nutrition Laboratory, Miles was inspired by Dodge's work and conducted a host of important research on the psychological effects of low and moderate dose alcohol. Miles created various apparatuses to test the effects of alcohol including the pursuit pendulum to measure eye motion and response times of intoxicated subjects. Psychologist C. James Goodwin reviewed Miles' work on alcohol research in a 2014 publication in the History of Psychology journal. Goodwin noted that Miles published several papers and technical reports on this work. However, most notably Miles compiled a 298-page monograph in 1924 detailing five sets of studies that spanned over 10 years. He first examined the effects of moderate doses of alcohol (i.e., 14%–22% by weight) on behavior and demonstrated that this impairs motor skills. Specifically, he gave five male participants moderate doses of alcohol and demonstrated that alcohol reduces typing efficiency, finger movement speed, and horizontal eye movement speed. Miles came up with a novel method of disguising placebo beverages in this study that is still used today: wiping the rim of the glass with alcohol. In the second study, Miles used similar methodology as the first study with the exception of giving participants alcohol after eating a full meal to see if food diluted the effects of alcohol. It reduced adverse effects, but still impair performance. In the third study, Miles collaborated with T. M. Carpenter to examine the effects of alcohol administered via rectal injection during sleep. Rectal injection of either alcohol or a saline solution was used to ensure the participant did not know if he was being administered alcohol or a placebo, and because it was believed that alcohol would be absorbed more quickly into the bloodstream than by oral administration. In the fourth study, Miles examined the effects of low dose alcohol on behavior by conducting a series of studies of two years with a 36-year-old male. This study lead to the fifth set of studies that further examined low dose alcohol using 8 subjects between the ages of 22 and 52.

Miles' research on the effects of alcohol in the 1920s was fitting given the debate about alcohol that led to National Prohibition. In 1917 before prohibition went into effect in 1920, President Woodrow Wilson cut the grain allotment to brewers and distillers maintaining that beer be reduced so that it could not contain more than 2.75% alcohol by weight, which is about 3.44% by volume today. There was much debate about this with drys saying that this was insufficient and alcohol should be banned altogether and with wets saying that small doses cannot have negative effects. Miles, who occasionally drank himself, was supportive of Prohibition and was suspicious of the wets claim. He started examining low doses of alcohol in 1919 right before prohibition went into effect.

Additionally, with the start of World War I, he became involved with war-related projects and, in collaboration with Dodge, designed gas masks and studied the effects of severely restricted food intake. However, the war had severed many relations Carnegie Laboratory had with researchers in Europe. As such, physiologist/chemist Francis Benedict chose Miles to reestablish important connections across Europe. As such, from April to August 1920 Miles visited 57 psychology and physiology laboratories and institutes across Europe to observe, record, and interact with researchers. The culmination of this trip was an unpublished 300-page detailed report of Miles' observations. This report was made available to the Archives of the History of American Psychology at the University of Akron and in September 2010 C. James Goodwin and Lizette Royer made this work available in print.

=== Stanford University (1922–1932) ===
Although Walter R. Miles was satisfied with his work at the Carnegie Institute of Technology, he missed the teaching and academic atmosphere he had experienced during his earlier time at Wesleyan University. When Lewis Terman offered him a position at Stanford University in Palo Alto, he accepted. At Stanford, Miles continued researching various psychological topics and developed a number of experimental devices, including a two-story rat maze designed for studies in learning and behavior. After Miles left Stanford to accept a faculty position at Yale University, Ernest Hilgard who succeeded him, remarked that the laboratory Miles left behind was "literally packed with devices ready to be operated, reminding me of a modern science museum". Miles is especially noted for directing the Stanford Later Maturity Studies, which focused on psychological development during the later stages of life.This work, which involved more than 2,000 subjects ranging in age from 6 to 95, included questionnaires, reaction time measurements, motor skills tasks, and various anthropometric and physiological assessments. His leadership in this project helped solidify his reputation in the field and contributed to his election as president of the American Psychological Association (APA) in 1932.

Another notable part of Miles' work at Stanford involved the preservation of Eadweard Muybridge's pioneering photographic studies of human and animal locomotion. Muybridge, who had been hired by Leland Stanford in the 1870s to resolve a debate of whether all four hooves of a galloping horse leave the ground at once. This led to Muybridge's first sequential motion studies titled Horse in Motion that used multiple cameras triggered in rapid sequence, contributing to early developments in both photography and motion science. This took place in Palo Alto near what would later become the Stanford University campus. By the time Miles arrived at Stanford, Muybridge’s original photographic equipment, including glass plate negatives and mechanical shutter systems, had deteriorated significantly.

Recognizing the historical and scientific value of Muybridge's work, Miles organized efforts to restore and preserve the surviving materials. He saw practical applications for Muybridge’s sequential photography in the study of human perception, particularly regarding how people perceive continuous motion from discrete images, a topic that would later become foundational in motion picture theory and cognitive psychology. Miles used these materials for teaching and research, thereby helping to integrate Muybridge's visual experiments into formal experimental psychology. His work ensured that Muybridge’s contributions extended beyond photography and art into the scientific understanding of motion and vision.

Archival records at Yale University, where Miles later continued his career, include references to his preservation activities at Stanford. Additionally, the Stanford University Libraries maintain documentation of the Muybridge Collection and acknowledge early preservation efforts initiated by faculty like Miles. Thanks to these interventions, Muybridge’s work remained accessible for later generations of researchers, historians, and artists.

=== Yale University (1932–1952) ===
Miles first came to Yale in 1930 before returning to Stanford in 1931. He came to Yale at the request of Dodge who asked Miles is there was "any possibility of inducing you to come here in a position parallel with mine with the expectation that within a few years you will take my place". Dodge was suffering from Parkinson's disease and wanted Miles to take over. In 1932 Miles made Yale his permanent place of work before reaching the mandatory retirement age over twenty years later in 1952. GRAND. Although his appointment was primarily at the Department of Psychology, his affiliation with the Medical School influenced his research AJ His early years at Yale were focused on publishing his findings from the Stanford Later Maturity Study. His work published from data collected at Yale were minor and highly specialized.

However, when World War II began Miles again became involved in war-related projects. He made one of the best contributions to aviation psychology when he discovered that while waiting to be called for flights, aviators could wear red-lensed goggles. These goggles helped with dark adaptation and could be worn at night so that flyers would immediately be ready for emergency flying when calls came.

=== University of Istanbul (1954–1957) ===
Despite Miles' retirement from Yale, he remained active in psychology. Ernest Hilgard heard about a visiting psychologist position at the University of Istanbul and recommended this to Miles given his love of travel. Miles took the position of Professor of Experimental Psychology and created and developed a laboratory there. Although his wife Catharine was also offered a position, she declined. Most notably, Miles supervised a dissertation of a woman who eventually accepted a position on the teaching staff there and the two edited a volume called the Istanbul Studies in Experimental Psychology.

=== Submarine Base at New London, Connecticut (1957–1965) ===
At the age of 72, Miles accepted a position as scientific director of the Submarine Base at New London, Connecticut, where he stayed for eight years. His work here included studying problems associated with living together in cramped quarters as well as the effects of long exposures to cold.

== Honors ==
Miles received many awards and recognitions during his distinguished career. Miles was APA president in 1932 a year before accepting a position at Yale. Miles received the Howard Crosby Warren Medal from the Society of Experimental Psychologists in 1949, and American Psychological Foundation Gold Medal in 1962, and was elected to the National Academy of Science in 1933 and the America Philosophical Society in 1944.

== Contributions to the field ==
Miles had several significant publications that influenced the field. His notable publications from his work with studying reaction time and physical exertion of football players:

- Miles, W. R.; Graves, B. C. (1931). "Studies in physical exertion: III. Effect of signal variation on football charging". Research Quarterly. 2 (3): 14–31.
- Miles, W. R. (1931). "Studies in physical exertion: II. Individual and group reaction time in football charging". Research Quarterly. 2 (3): 5–13.

His notable publications on apparatuses and inventions:

- Miles, W. R. (1920). "A pursuit pendulum". Psychological Review. 27 (5): 361–376. doi:10.1037/h0073920.
- Miles, W.R (1927). "The two-story duplicate maze". Journal of Experimental Psychology. 10: 365–377. doi:10.1037/h0073950.
- Miles, W.R. (1943). "Red goggles for producing dark adaptation". Federal Proceedings of American Society for Experimental Biology. 2: 109–115.

His notable publication from his work on alcohol and impairment:

- Miles, W. R. (1924). Alcohol and human efficiency: Experiments with moderate quantities and dilute solutions of ethyl alcohol

on human subjects. Washington, DC: The Carnegie Institute.

- Miles, W. R. (1918). Effect of alcohol on psycho-physiological functions (No. 266). Carnegie Institution of Washington.

== Personal life ==
In 1908, Miles married his college sweetheart Elizabeth Mae Kirk and they had three children: Thomas, Caretta, and Marjorie. Kirk died in 1925, leaving Miles widowed with three teenage children. Two years later, he married psychologist Catharine Cox Miles, who was best known in the field of gifted education. He had one child with Catharine named Anna and a son, Charles, who died at birth. Miles and Catharine collaborated throughout their careers and were together until Miles' death on May 15, 1978, in Sandy Springs, Maryland. Catharine died less than a decade later.
