= Childhood development of fine motor skills =

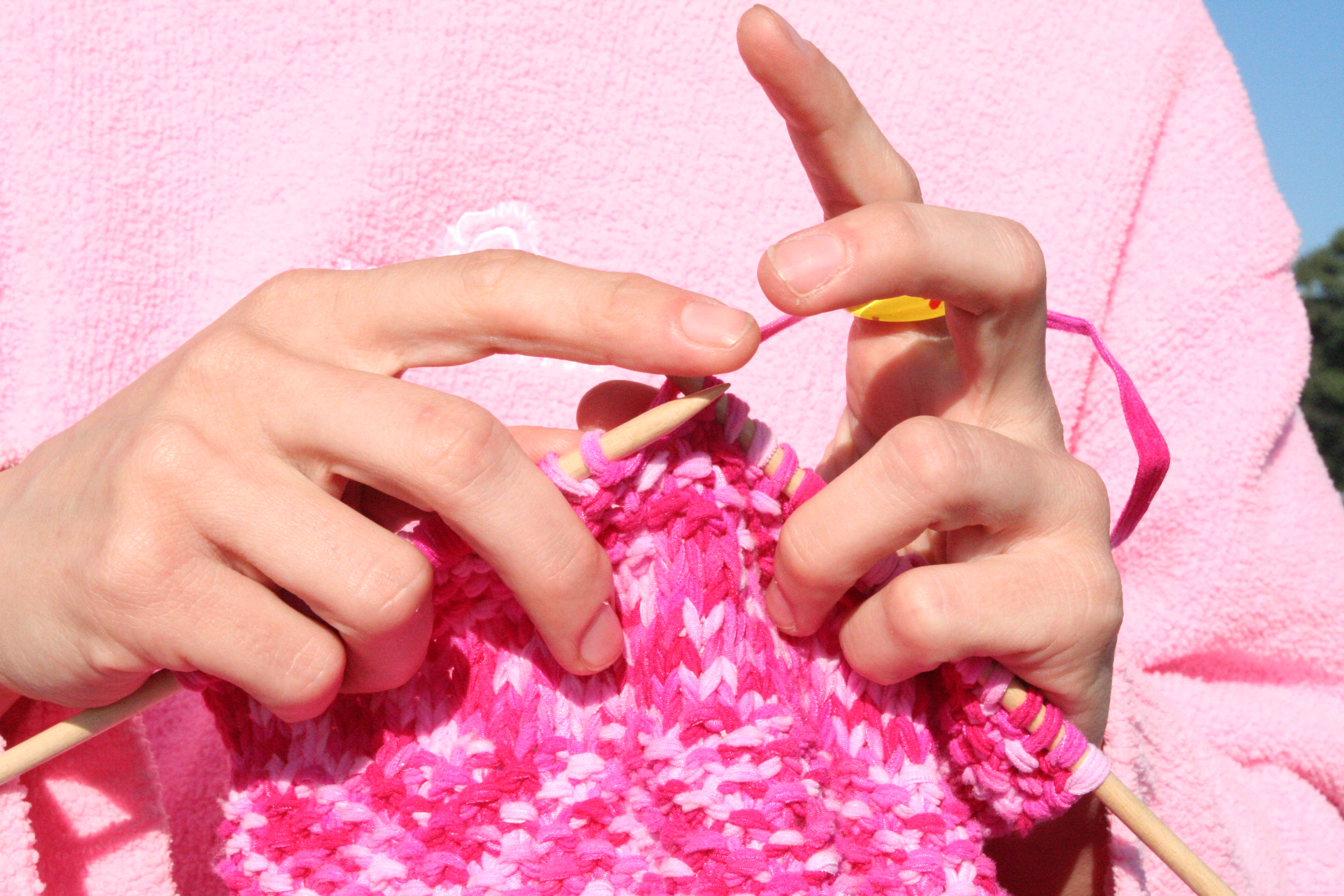
Dexterity is helpful in working with knitting needles.

Fine motor skills are the coordination of small muscle movements which occur e.g., in the fingers, usually in coordination with the eyes. In application to motor skills of hands (and fingers) the term dexterity is commonly used.

The term 'dexterity' is defined by Latash and Turrey (1996) as a 'harmony in movements' (p. 20). Dexterity is a type of fine coordination usually demonstrated in upper extremity function (Kohlmeyer, 1998).

The abilities which involve the use of hands develop over time, starting with primitive gestures such as grabbing at objects to more precise activities that involve precise eye–hand coordination. Fine motor skills are skills that involve a refined use of the small muscles controlling the hand, fingers, and thumb. The development of these skills allows one to be able to complete tasks such as writing, drawing, and buttoning.

According to the results of a study conducted in the USA assessing the difference in foundational motor skills between males and females between the age of five and six years old, there was no significant difference between gender. However, the results displayed a difference in the ability to catch and aim between the six-year-old males and females. The study's results proposed that these gender differences are not concrete when adding age as an observing factor.

During the infant and toddler years, children develop basic grasping and manipulation skills, which are refined during the preschool years. The preschooler becomes quite adept in self-help, construction, holding grips, and bimanual control tasks requiring the use of both hands.

— Essa, E., Young, R. & Lehne, L., Introduction to early childhood education, 2nd Ed. (1998)

Young children's lives consistent with visual and performing arts that hold as much importance as language and play (Child Development Division, & California Department of Education. 2011, p. 40). "The arts build skills such as problem-solving and critical thinking; they bring parallel opportunities for the development of language/communication, mathematics, and the development of social and interpersonal skills. The following activities are often referred to as children's play: scribbling with a crayon, pretending to be a pirate or a bird, humming bits of a tune, banging on a drum, or swaying to music".

== Self-care skills ==
As children refine their motor skills, they are able to help themselves by completing daily activities independently. For example, children between the ages of 2 and 3 are able to put on and take off simplistic articles of clothing. They are able to manipulate clothing with zippers, use spoons, string together beads with large holes, and open doors with doorknobs. When children are between the ages of 3 and 4, they are able to manipulate clothing with larger buttons, use scissors to cut paper, and are able to copy simple lined shapes using a pencil. At 4 to 5 years of age, children are able to dress and undress themselves without assistance. They are also able to manipulate a fork, and have gained the dexterity to cut around shapes with a pair of scissors. By age 6, a child is able to cut softer foods with a knife and is able to tie their own shoes. Because all children develop at their own rate, these ages are not exact to when every child will develop these skills.

== Writing skills ==
Parental involvement can influence the stage of writing within their child. Parents who are more involved in their child's learning process will see significant improvements in their child's accuracy and clarity. Those children who are exposed to the support of their parents will develop more proficient fine motor skills. This involvement in a child's development is a first step towards the concept of parent engagement. Parent engagement is defined as "...parents and teachers sharing a responsibility to help their children learn and meet educational goals. Parent engagement happens when teachers involve parents in school meetings or events, and parents volunteer their support at home and at school. In this way, they make a commitment. Parents commit to prioritizing their child's educational goals, and teachers commit to listening and providing a space for collaboration with parents". According to "... fifty different studies on parental engagement, educational researchers found a connection between family involvement and academic achievement".

Children who show a better grasp of fine motor skills are known to have better outcomes in academics. According to the results of a study conducted by Wolff, Gunnoe, and Cohen, observing the development of fine motor skills may provide us with an idea of the strength and capability a child obtains to achieve successful motor skills and academic proficiency. Basic fine motor skills that are associated with the predictability of the success of a child's development and achievement in their academic and personal life are typically known as "visual-motor integration, fine motor accuracy, visual-spatial perception, kinesthesia, and imitation of postures".

== Children's drawings ==
Children's drawings also develop as a child ages and refines their fine motor skills. This has been widely studied, especially by Rhoda Kellogg (1898–1987), following children from 2 years to 8 years of age. Her research has found that the artistic gestures of children evolve from basic scribbles to consistent symbols. The first symbols that are formed by children are the circle, the upright cross, the diagonal cross, the rectangle, and other common forms. When the child is 3 years old, they begin to form face shapes and by age 4, humans. At 4 to 5 years old, the child draws a human form with arms and legs, and eventually the child adds a trunk and clothes. Children then evolve to include other pictorials in their art, such as houses, animals and boats, by the age of 5.

=== Manipulative materials ===
Toys that require a child to manipulate it with their fingers and hands can be categorized as a manipulative. Manipulatives involve coordinating the eye to what the hands are needed to do. They stimulate fine motor development because they require controlled use of hand and finger muscles. Some manipulative toys, such as puzzles, are self-correcting, fitting together in only one specific way. These types of toys only fit together one way and allow children to work until they achieve success. Play-Doh is a manipulative that can help strengthen a child's fine motor skills. Dough can be rolled into balls, tooth picks can be used to create designs in the dough, and plastic knives can be used to cut the dough (with supervision).

=== Eye-Coordination ===
Any of the manipulative activities requiring utensils develop eye-hand coordination. Constructing with Legos, blocks, or popsicle sticks builds eye-hand coordination. Balancing objects such as blocks requires precise hand motions.Other precision motor activities include playing the piano, playing with a cash register, pushing buttons, typing, working puzzles, stringing beads, weaving, and sewing. Even large muscle activities such as climbing a ladder, playing Simon Says, and jumping rope help build eye-hand coordination.

=== Positioning ===
Another way to assist a child who is having difficulties developing their fine motor skills is to provide the child with proper positioning of their hands and body to accomplish tasks.

Positioning is very important for engagement in fine motor tasks. A child's seat should allow [them] to sit comfortably with [their] feet placed firmly on the floor. [Their] hips, knees, and ankles should be at 90 degree angles, with [their] torso slightly forward. [Their] desk height should be approximately 2 inches above [their] elbows when [their] arms are at rest at [their] side. If the child's chair is too tall, leaving [their] feet dangling, create a makeshift footrest out of old telephone books bound together with masking or another strong tape to provide added stability. Keep in mind that trunk stability is necessary for good mobility of the arms, hands, and fingers.

— Linda Kennedy

As motor skills develop, children's hand grip positioning changes as well. Their grip starts off with a palmar supinate grasp. This grasp involves wrapping the entire hand around the implement used in the shape of a fist with the palm facing upwards. Children then progress to a digital pronate grasp, in which they hold the implement with their palm facing downward. The pronate grasp involves using the middle finger and thumb. Children at this stage are able to use their thumb for tactile prehension. This stage can be mastered by the age of 2–4 years old. They then progress to a static tri-posture grasp and then to a dynamic tripod grasp as their fingers and thumb start to play more of a function. Over time, their hands will begin to move closer to the tip of the implement used, allowing for more precise control over movement technique. The refinement in the position in which they hold the writing utensil goes from holding it from the top to the bottom (closer to the tip).
