= The Longevity Project =

2011 book

- First edition
- Author: Howard S. Friedman and Leslie R. Martin
- Publisher: Hudson Street Press
- Publication date: 2011
- Pages: 272

The Longevity Project is a 2011 book on the social and psychological characteristics associated with long human longevity. Written by Howard S. Friedman and Leslie R. Martin, the book is based on a 20-year study extending the 60 years of Lewis Terman's Genetic Studies of Genius research.

== Bibliography ==
- Bongaarts, John (2012). "Review of The Longevity Project: Surprising Discoveries for Health and Long Life from the Landmark Eight-Decade Study". Population and Development Review. 38 (1): 175–176. ISSN 0098-7921. JSTOR 41857366.
- Bouton, Katherine (April 18, 2011). "Eighty Years Along, a Longevity Study Still Has Ground to Cover". The New York Times. ISSN 0362-4331.
- Greenwood, Veronique (March 10, 2011). "The Longevity Project: Decades of Data Reveal Paths to Long Life". The Atlantic.
- Haden, Jeff (June 11, 2018). "This 95-Year Stanford Study Reveals 1 Secret to Living a Longer, More Fulfilling Life". Inc.com.
- Landro, Laura (March 9, 2011). "How to Keep Going and Going". Wall Street Journal. ISSN 0099-9660.
- "Secrets To Longevity: It's Not All About Broccoli". NPR. March 24, 2011.
