= Ruth Winifred Howard =

American psychologist

Ruth Howard
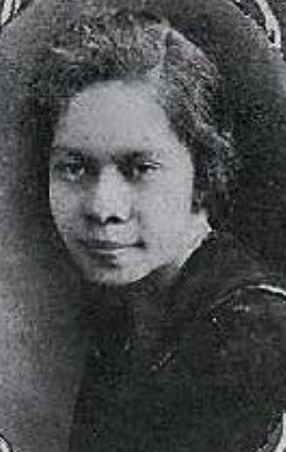
- Ruth Winifred Howard, from the 1920 yearbook of Howard University
- Born: March 25, 1900; Washington D.C.
- Died: February 12, 1997 (aged 96); Washington D.C.
- Occupation: Psychologist
- Known for: Being one of the first African American women to receive a Ph.D. in Psychology
- Spouse: Albert Sidney Beckham

Ruth Winifred Howard (March 25, 1900 – February 12, 1997) was an American psychologist. She is best known for her psychological work concerning students with special needs at Children's Provident Hospital School. She is the second African American women to earn a Ph.D. in Psychology. Howard was an active participant in the American Psychological Association, the International Council of Women Psychologists, the American Association of University Women, the National Association of College Women (an African American-based group), and the Women's International League for Peace and Freedom. She also received instruction from Florence Goodenough.

== Early life ==
Ruth Winifred Howard was born on March 25, 1900, in Washington D.C., to Reverend William J. Howard and Alverda Brown Howard. She was the youngest of 8 children. As a child, she enjoyed reading and aspired to be a librarian. Howard's mother strongly encouraged her reading habit. She considered her father's active work in the community as one of the main sources of her passion to help other people and as what influenced her work with disabled children. In 1916, she graduated from the historic M Street High school, now known as Dunbar High School.

== Education and career ==
After graduating from high school, Howard attended Simmons College in Boston, Massachusetts where she majored in social work. In 1921, she received her bachelor's degree and moved to Cleveland, Ohio where she started as a social worker. Shortly after, she went back to Simmons College and received her master's degree in 1927.

Howard received the Laura Spelman Rockefeller fellowship in 1929 and again in 1930. With this fellowship, she attended the Teacher's College and School of Social Work at Columbia University from 1929 to 1930 and studied child psychology at the Child Development Institute at the University of Minnesota from 1930 to 1934.

In 1934, she received her Ph.D. in psychology and child development from the University of Minnesota.

Howard studied the development of triplets for her doctoral dissertation. One of her main conclusions was that triplets were less developed in general abilities compared to single children. She was awarded an internship at the Illinois Institute for Juvenile Research after receiving her doctorate and eventually began her own clinical psychology-based private practice.

From 1940 to 1964, Howard co-directed the Center for Psychological Services with her husband Albert Sidney Beckham. During this time, Howard also held the staff psychologist position at the Provident Hospital School of Nursing in Chicago, which trained African American nurses. Additionally, she held the position of a psychological consultant at Florida and Missouri schools of nursing while lecturing, working at psychology clinics, and consulting for other organizations.

From 1964 to 1966, she worked at the McKinley Center for Retarded Children as a psychologist. Afterwards, she worked at Worthington and Hurst Psychological Consultants as a staff psychologist until 1968. She then became a psychologist for the Chicago Board of Health until 1972.

== Community organizations ==
Howard volunteered with the Young Women's Christian Association of Chicago and played a role in coordinating the National Association of College Women. She was also a part of several professional organizations, such as the American Psychological Association, the International Council of Women Psychologists, and the International Psychological Association.

== Personal life ==
In 1934, she married Albert Sidney Beckham and moved to Chicago, Illinois, where she remained until 1987. Beckham died in 1964. Howard continued her work in Chicago as a consultant for children's programs at the Abraham Lincoln Center and Worthington and Hurst Psychological Consultants, a psychologist for the McKinley Center for Retarded Children, on the Chicago Health Board, Mental Health Division, and her private practice for another four years. She died on February 12, 1997, in Washington, DC. She was a member of Delta Sigma Theta sorority.
