= Brigance Inventory of Early Development ii =

The Brigance Inventory of Early Development II (IED II) is a child development assessment. It is designed to provide information on how a child is performing in 5 key developmental areas:

- Language Domain (receptive and expressive)
- Motor Domain (gross motor and fine motor skills)
- Academic-Cognitive (general/quantitative and pre-reading skills)
- Daily Living Domain (self-help and prevocational)
- Social-Emotional Domain (play skills and behavior and engagement/initiation skills)

== Test ==
The inventory provides information in 11 criterion-referenced, skill-based developmental areas:

- Perambulatory Motor Skills and Behaviors
- Gross-Motor Skills and Behaviors
- Fine-Motor Skills and Behaviors
- Self-help Skills
- Speech and Language Skills
- General Knowledge and Comprehension
- Social-Emotional Development
- Early Academic Skills Sections
- Readiness
- Basic Reading Skills
- Manuscript Writing
- Basic Math

== See also ==
- Albert Brigance
- Denver Developmental Screening Tests
