= Genetic Studies of Genius =

Longitudinal study in the field of psychology

The Genetic Studies of Genius, later known as the Terman Study of the Gifted, is currently the oldest and longest-running longitudinal study in the field of psychology. It was begun by Lewis Terman at Stanford University in 1921 to examine the development and characteristics of gifted children into adulthood.

The results from the study have been published in five books, a monograph, and dozens of articles. A related retrospective study of eminent men in history by Catharine Cox, though not part of the longitudinal study, was published as part of the Genetic Studies of Genius. It further inspired the ongoing Study of Mathematically Precocious Youth longitudinal study.

== Origin ==
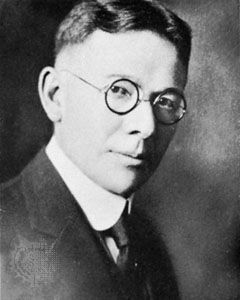
Lewis Terman, founder of the Genetic Studies of Genius

Terman had previously performed studies in intelligence, including his doctoral dissertation. In 1916, he adapted Alfred Binet's intelligence test for the United States and expanded its range. The result was the Stanford–Binet Intelligence Scales, which are still in use today (in an updated form). After his service in developing the Army Alpha during World War I, Terman returned to Stanford in order to start his study.

Terman had already found some bright children through his earlier research, and some of these were part of the sample in the Genetic Studies of Genius. He hired several assistants, including Florence Goodenough and Catharine Cox, to search the public schools of California for similarly gifted children. Terman initially hoped to find the 1,000 most intelligent children, but eventually found 1,444. However, Terman gradually added subjects to the study through 1928 until there were 1,528 (856 males and 672 females). Not all subjects were discovered with the Stanford–Binet. Some were selected for the study with the National Intelligence Tests and the Army Alpha. The study subjects were born between 1900 and 1925, all lived in California, were 95–99% white, and the majority came from upper- or middle-class families.

== Early findings ==
Terman's goal was to disprove the then-current belief that gifted children were sickly, socially inept, and not well-rounded. Therefore, the first volume of the study reported data on the children's family, educational progress, special abilities, interests, play, and personality. He also examined the children's racial and ethnic heritage. Terman was a proponent of eugenics, although not as radical as many of his contemporary Social Darwinists, and believed that intelligence testing could be used as a positive tool to shape society.

Based on data collected in 1921–22, Terman concluded that gifted children suffered no more health problems than normal for their age, save a little more myopia than average. He also found that the children were usually social, were well-adjusted, did better in school, and were even taller than average. A follow-up performed in 1923–1924 found that the children had maintained their high IQs and were still above average overall. Data collected in the 1920s, also including a pioneering effort to implement above-level testing on a large scale, a practice that is widespread in gifted education today.

== Follow-ups ==
Terman planned later follow-ups, and in his lifetime data would be collected in 1928, 1936, 1940, 1945, 1950, and 1955. At his death, the study was directed by Melita Oden, who collected additional data in 1960. Robert Richardson Sears later took charge of the study and collected data in 1972, 1977, 1982, and 1986. Moreover, many study participants corresponded with Terman or visited Stanford University in order to keep him updated on their lives.

According to those who have access to the study archives, the files also include news articles, letters, and other documents related to the study participants. The later follow-ups asked questions about war service, college education, marital status and happiness, work, retirement, raising children, and other lifetime events and concerns.

Well over half of men and women in Terman's study finished college, compared to 8% of the general population at the time. Some of Terman's subjects reached great prominence in their fields. Among them were head I Love Lucy writer Jess Oppenheimer, American Psychological Association president and educational psychologist Lee Cronbach, Ancel Keys, and Robert Sears himself. Over fifty men became college and university faculty members. However, the majority of study participants' lives were more mundane. By the 4th volume of Genetic Studies of Genius, Terman had noted that as adults, his subjects pursued common occupations "as humble as those of policeman, seaman, typist and filing clerk" and concluded:

At any rate, we have seen that intellect and achievement are far from perfectly correlated.

== Criticism ==
The study has been criticized for not having a generalizable sample. Moreover, Terman meddled in his subjects' lives, giving them letters of recommendation for jobs and college and pulling strings at Stanford to help them get admitted. This makes the life outcomes of the sample biased and difficult to generalize.

In his book Fads and Foibles in Modern Sociology and Related Sciences (p. 70–76), sociologist Pitirim Sorokin criticized the research, saying that Terman's selected group of children with high IQs did about as well as a random group of children selected from similar family backgrounds would have done.

As in any longitudinal study, it is possible that the characteristics and behaviors of the sample are a partial result of the era in which they lived. Indeed, many members of the sample could not attend college, due to the Great Depression and World War II. Almost half of women in the sample were homemakers for most of their lives. Despite these shortcomings, the data from the sample is often used for studies because there is no other group of people who have been followed for so long.

== Today ==
As time has passed, the sample has dwindled. As of 2003, there were over 200 members of the sample still alive. The study is to continue until the final member of the sample either withdraws or dies. In the 21st century, researchers continue to publish articles based on the data collected in the Genetic Studies of Genius. For example, one article found that men who skipped a grade in childhood had higher incomes throughout adulthood.

== See also ==
- Eugenics in the United States
- Heritability of IQ
- Grant Study
- Hunter College Elementary School
- The Longevity Project
