= Albert Sidney Beckham =

American psychologist

Albert Sidney Beckham (1897–1964) was the first African American to hold the title of school psychologist. He was a pioneering African American psychologist specializing in educational psychology and made significant contributions to the base of knowledge about the racial intelligence score disparity. Additionally, he taught in the New York public school system and was a professor at Wilberforce University and Howard University. He served the Chicago school district as their first African American school psychologist.

== Education ==
Beckham was educated in Christian schools and received private tutoring to prepare for college. Beckham's time in school was marked by government sanctioned segregation and discrimination against African Americans. Because of this, all of his higher education was received from northern colleges and universities. Which was common for African Americans to do at the time.

At the age of fifteen, Beckham enrolled at Lincoln University and was a fellow student of Francis Sumner, who would become the first African American to earn a Ph.D. in psychology. In 1915 Beckham graduated with a BA in psychology and began graduate study at Ohio State University the same year. While at Ohio State, he earned a second bachelor's degree in 1916 and a master's degree in psychology in 1917. From 1917 to 1920, Beckham served as an assistant professor of psychology at Wilberforce University.

In 1921, Beckham began his doctoral studies at Columbia University but transferred to New York University (NYU) because there was more financial aid available at NYU. In 1924, Beckham suspended his doctoral studies to accept an instructor position, and later an assistant professor, at Howard University, becoming the first person to teach psychology at the institution, and also opened the university's first psychology lab. After five years at Howard University, he went back to NYU to finish his doctorate in 1930.

== Career and legacy ==
Beckham's scholarly work largely focused on education; however, he also conducted studies on topics such as albinism, narcolepsy, race attitudes, and life satisfaction.

Beckham was a pioneer in the field of Black psychology and among the first African Americans to earn a PhD in psychology. Beckham had a desire to contribute to the WWI war effort and applied to begin aviation training for the Air Force. His application was rejected by the War Department without giving him an explanation. This was not unusual as aviation positions were largely reserved for men of European descent. After making repeated requests as to what his application had been rejected, he was told that he could become a War Professor of Psychology at Wilberforce University instead. In 1924, Albert Beckham became the first person to teach psychology at Howard University. While there, he founded one of the first psychology laboratories. After his time at Howard University, Beckham moved to the Institute for Juvenile Research in Illinois. While there, he focused his research efforts of racial bias in intelligence testing and provided therapy to juveniles within the Chicago public school system. Beckham spent most of his life fighting against discrimination of African American children, and hoped to use scientific research to bring equality between the races. Much of his research was around the topic of intelligence, especially in African American adolescents. He was one of the psychologists of color, including Drs. Horacce Mann Bond, Herman Canady, Martin Jenkins, and George Sanchez, who set out to debunk Francis Galton's theory of eugenics, which suggested that whites were intellectually superior to African Americans. Beckham's research into this field found that the largest influences on intelligence were socio-economic background and the child's environment. Beckham was just one of several African American researchers testing African American intelligence, in order to provide evidence against claims made by anti-African American propaganda.

Working in Chicago, Beckham had access to a large population of African American children. He worked with the Institute of Juvenile Research to help understand the roots of juvenile delinquency. It was Beckham's belief that with the correct therapy, and an early behavioral diagnosis many juvenile children could have been helped from having any criminal record. Beckham also goes on to state in one of his publications, that juvenile delinquency could be severely reduced if individuals went off of scientific research rather than perceived stereotypes. His works also included groundbreaking research on church-neighborhood-school relationship, which benefited American youth.

One of Beckham's primary findings was in a study he conducted on IQ level and race. Test results indicated that socioeconomic status, rather than racial category, has a larger impact on IQ score. This challenged much of the research narrative at the time that supported Eugenics and IQ differences between race.

While Beckham's time at the Institute for Juvenile Research was enjoyable, he chose to look for employment elsewhere with the hope of increasing his salary, due to the Great Depression's impact on the institute's budget. After taking the Chicago Board of Education's psychologist exam, he was listed as the number one applicant on the available applicants list. However, he was not offered the position. The National Urban League then pressured the Board to him him, after which the Director of the Bureau of Child Study reluctantly offered Beckham the position.

== Personal life ==
Beckham married Ruth Winifred Howard in 1934 and the couple moved to Chicago, where they lived until 1987.

== Selected works ==
Beckham, A. S. (1924). Applied eugenics. Crisis, 28(1), 177–178.

Beckham, A. S. (1929). Is the Negro happy? Journal of Abnormal and Social Psychology, 24(2), 186–190. https://doi.org/10.1037/h0072938

Beckham, A. S. (1930). A study of intelligence of colored adolescents of different economic and social status in typical metropolitan areas [Doctoral dissertation, New York University]. https://library.nyu.edu

Beckham, A. S. (1931). Juvenile delinquency and the Negro. Opportunity, 9, 300–302.

Beckham, A. (1932). The Negro child of pre-school age. The Southern Workman, 61, 221–226.

Beckham, A. S. (1932). Race and intelligence. Opportunity, 10, 240–242.

Beckham, A. S. (1933). A study of the intelligence of colored adolescents of different social-economic status in typical metropolitan areas. The Journal of Social Psychology, 4(1), 70–91. https://doi.org/10.1080/00224545.1933.9921558

Beckham, A. S., (1933). Over-Suggestibility in Juvenile Delinquency. The Journal of Abnormal and Social Psychology, 28(2), 172–178. http://dx.doi.org/10.1037/h0070124

Beckham, A. S., & Israeli, N. (1933). Political, racial, and differential psychology. The Journal of Social Psychology, 4, 1.

Beckham, A. S. (1934). A study of race attitudes in negro children of adolescent age. Journal of Abnormal and Social Psychology, 29(1), 18–29. https://doi.org/10.1037/h0070753

Beckham, A. S. (1939). The intelligence of a Negro high school population in a Northern city. The Pedagogical Seminary and Journal of Genetic Psychology, 54(2), 327–336. https://doi.org/10.1080/08856559.1939.10534339

Beckham, A. S. (1942). A study of social background and art aptitude of superior Negro children. Journal of Applied Psychology, 26(6), 777. https://doi.org/10.1037/h0056017

Beckham, A. S. (1942). A study of social background and music ability of superior Negro children. Journal of Applied Psychology, 26(2), 210–217. https://doi.org/10.1037/h0054822

Beckham, A. S. (1946). Albinism in Negro children. The Pedagogical Seminary and Journal of Genetic Psychology, 69(2), 199–215. https://doi.org/10.1080/08856559.1946.10533389
