= John Edward Anderson (psychologist) =

American psychologist

John Edward Anderson (1893–1966) was an American psychologist. He was the 52nd president of the American Psychological Association (APA) in 1943, and editor of Psychological Bulletin from 1942 to 1946. He also made significant contributions to the field of child psychology.

== Early life ==
Anderson was born in Laramie, Wyoming (1893) and completed his undergraduate work at the University of Wyoming. He travelled east to complete his doctorate in psychology at Harvard University. After graduating, he entered military service during World War I and became the head instructor at the School of Military Psychology at Camp Greenleaf in Georgia. He married Dorothea Lynde of Chattanooga, Tennessee.

== Career ==
In 1919, Anderson was hired by Yale University. He also assumed the role of Secretary of the APA. In 1925, he moved to the University of Minnesota to become Director of their Rockefeller-funded Institute for Child Welfare. In 1930, he served as Chairman of the Conference Committee on the Infant and Pre-school for the White House Conference on Child Health and Protection, which resulted in twenty volumes on the progress in social welfare, health care, and educational facilities of young children. Over the course of the 1930s he published two books on child psychology and co-authored the Minnesota Occupational Scale with Florence Goodenough.

Anderson's most significant scientific contributions are said to have been a 1939 article on the limitations of intelligence testing with very young children. In 1942, he became editor of Psychological Bulletin, and he was elected president of the APA. His presidency coincided with World War II, so he was a key player in the contentious merger between the old science-oriented APA and the newer practice-oriented American Association for Applied Psychology. This marked the start of the modern APA.

Relinquishing his editorship of Psychological Bulletin after a single term, Anderson immediately wrote a classic chapter on the methods of child psychology which appeared in Leonard Carmichael's 1946 Manual of Child Psychology. He served in executive roles on number of professional and scientific organizations, including vice president of the American Association for the Advancement of Science (Section I, Psychology) and president of the Society for Research in Child Development.

== Death ==
Anderson retired from Minnesota in 1961 and moved to Chattanooga, Tennessee, where he died after a long illness on May 10, 1966.
