= Albert Brigance =

Albert H. Brigance (September 13, 1932 — September 12, 2007) was an American author and special education resource specialist from Maryville, Tennessee.

In 1975-1978 Brigance created a comprehensive inventory of basic skills for his own use in his work as an assessment specialist for the California Master Plan in Humboldt and Del-Norte counties in northern California. Colleagues urged him to find a commercial publisher. The Brigance Inventory of Basic Skills became an instrument for assessment evaluation, student academic placement, Individual Educational Plans (IEPs), and instructional planning.

Subsequent instruments include early childhood screening instruments, and other inventories for individuals from birth through secondary levels of education. Recent revisions of the screens and inventories have included standardized, normed assessments, and online data management services from publisher, Curriculum Associates, Inc.

September 28, 2012, Southeastern Oklahoma State University, Durant, OK, opened the Albert H. Brigance Curriculum and Assessment Center, housed in the Henry G. Bennett Memorial Library on campus. In 1999, Albert Brigance ('55) was honored as a Distinguished Alumnus of Southeastern Oklahoma State University.

== See also ==
- Brigance Inventory of Early Development (IED ii)
- Developmental-Behavioral Screening and Surveillance
