= Wang Yani =

Chinese artist (born 1975)

- 王亚妮
- Born: May 2, 1975 (age 51); Guangxi, China
- Education: Academy of Fine Arts Munich
- Known for: Painting
- Spouse: Wu Min-an
- Father: Wang Shiqiang
- Relatives: Wang Qiangyu (brother)

Wang Yani (Chinese: 王亚妮; pinyin: Wáng Yànī; born 1975) is a Chinese artist who began painting at the age of two-and-a-half. Her work was exhibited in China when she was four, appeared on a postage stamp when she was eight, and she had a solo exhibition at a museum in London when she was fourteen, and soon after, at the Arthur M. Sackler Gallery at the Smithsonian Institution, in a traveling exhibit organized by the Nelson-Atkins Museum of Art in Kansas City, Missouri. The Sackler exhibit included a painting done when she was three entitled "Kitty."

At sixteen, six different books had been written about Wang Yani. Telling stories of a brilliant girl who loved to paint monkeys, baboons, and cats, and who was known as a young teen who painted as curators of the Smithsonian watched her create beautiful birds and flowers with her dancing brush.

Wang Yani also exhibited in Germany and grew to love that country in her middle teen years. Studying the German language and winning a scholarship to study art in Germany, in 1996 began to study art at the Academy of Fine Arts Munich. She has had many exhibitions in Germany since 1996, including at Galerie Jaspers.

She is married to photographer Wu Min-an.
