= Tadpole person =

Simplistic humanoid figure

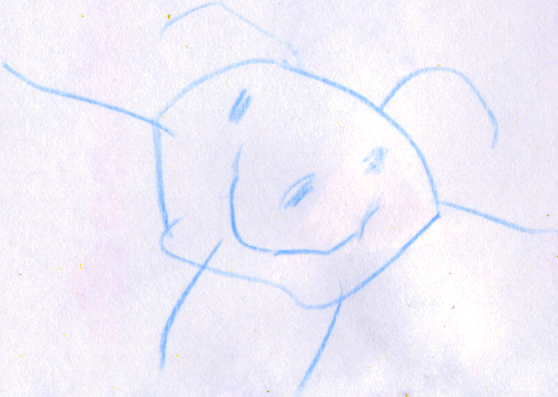
An example of a tadpole person in a drawing by a child aged 4½.

A tadpole person or headfooter is a simplistic representation of a human being as a figure without a torso, with arms and legs attached to the head. Tadpole people appear in young children's drawings before they learn to draw torsos and move on to more realistic depictions such as stick figures.

Preschoolers who draw tadpole people generally do not draw torsos, even when instructed to include features that are part of the torso, such as a belly button. Instead, they tend to draw the feature onto the tadpole person without modifying the figure.

== Clinical significance ==
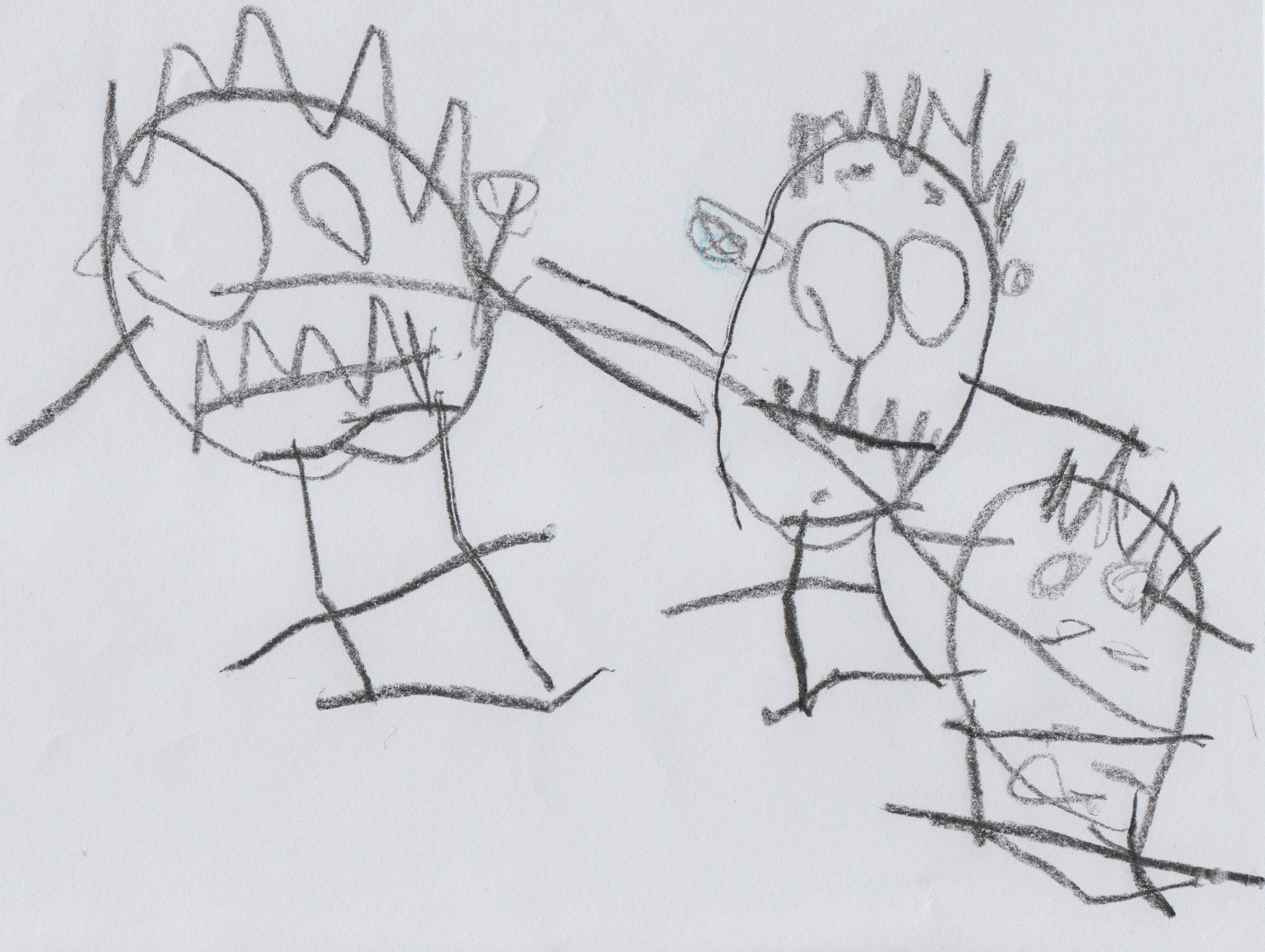
A child's drawing of a family, represented as tadpole people.

In cognitive tests such as the Draw-a-Person test, the drawing of tadpole people by adults may indicate a cognitive impairment. For example, patients with dementia tend to draw tadpole people when tasked to draw human figures.

== Cultural influence ==
In June 2015, a study examined the tadpole self-drawings of 183 children. It found that the basic vertical structure of a tadpole person is not affected by a child's cultural background, though certain features still varied depending on their ecosocial context. Children from educated and urban circumstances drew themselves with a wider range of facial expressions and a taller height, whereas children from rural and traditional contexts drew themselves with fewer facial expressions and a shorter height.

== In art ==
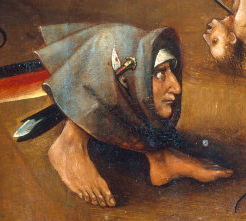
Detail of the centre panel of the triptych The Last Judgment by Hieronymus Bosch, showing a gryllos that bears resemblance to a headfooter.

The early work of Austrian artist Oswald Tschirtner often contained headfooters.

The Last Judgment by Hieronymus Bosch features a gryllos that shares features with headfooters.

Fictional characters such as Roger Hargreaves's Mr. Men or the video game character Kirby have this type of design, which may appeal to young children who draw people in this way.

== See also ==
- Headless men
