= Draw-a-Person test =

Psychological test for children and adolescents

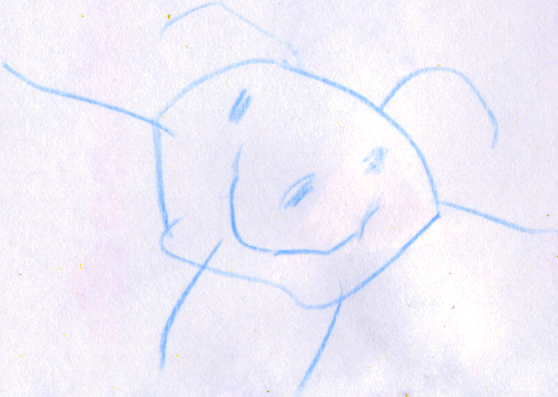
Smiling tadpole person (combined head and body) drawn by a child aged 4½.

The Draw-a-Person test (DAP, DAP test), Draw-a-Man test (DAM), or Goodenough–Harris Draw-a-Person test is a type of test in the domain of psychology. It is used to evaluate children and adolescents for a variety of purposes, including mental health disorders. It is also intended as a personality test, specifically projective test, and a cognitive test. The test subject uses simple art supplies to produce depictions of people.

== History ==
Developed originally by Florence Goodenough in 1926, this test was first known as the Goodenough Draw-a-Man test. It is detailed in her book titled Measurement of Intelligence by Drawings. Dale B. Harris later revised and extended the test, and it is now known as the Goodenough–Harris Drawing Test. The revision and extension are detailed in his book Children's Drawings as Measures of Intellectual Maturity (1963). Scoring for cognitive or IQ results on the test was further updated with a quantitative scoring system (QSS) by Jack Naglieri in 1988. In 1991, Naglieri created a version of the test to screen for emotional disturbance called Draw a Person: Screening Procedure for Emotional Disturbance (DAP:SPED).

== Administration ==
Test administration involves the administrator requesting children to complete three individual drawings on separate pieces of paper. Children are asked to draw a man, a woman, and themselves. No further instructions are given and the child is free to make the drawing in whichever way he/she would like. There is no right or wrong type of drawing, although the child must make a drawing of a whole person each time—i.e. head to feet, not just the face. The test has no time limit; however, children rarely take longer than about 10 or 15 minutes to complete all three drawings. Harris's book (1963) provides scoring scales which are used to examine and score the child's drawings. The test is completely non-invasive and non-threatening to children, which is part of its appeal. Administrators typically record behavioral observations during the test, such as attention, persistence, and response to prompts. These qualitative notes can provide context for unusual drawings or incomplete figures. Even so, any inferences drawn from the test should be supported by additional measures and clinical history.

The purpose of the test is to assist professionals in inferring children's cognitive developmental levels with little or no influence of other factors such as language barriers or special needs. Any other uses of the test are merely projective and are not endorsed by the first creator.

== Evaluation ==
To evaluate cognitive development, a test administrator can use the Draw-a-Person: QSS (quantitative scoring system). This system analyzes fourteen different aspects of the drawings (such as specific body parts and clothing) for various criteria, including presence or absence, detail, and proportion. Goodenough's original scale had 46 scoring items for each drawing, with 5 bonus items for drawings in profile. Harris's scale had 73 items for male figures and 71 for female figures. More recent versions use 64 scoring items for each drawing. A separate standard score is recorded for each drawing, and a total score for all three. The use of a nonverbal, nonthreatening task to evaluate cognitive abilities is intended to eliminate possible sources of bias by reducing variables like primary language, verbal skills, communication disabilities, and sensitivity to working under pressure. However, test results can be influenced by previous drawing experience, a factor that may account for the tendency of middle-class children to score higher on this test than lower-class children, who often have fewer opportunities to draw.

To assess the test-taker for emotional problems, the administrator uses the Draw-a-Person: SPED (Screening Procedure for Emotional Disturbance) to score the drawings. This system is composed of two types of criteria. For the first type, eight dimensions of each drawing are evaluated against norms for the child's age group. For the second type, 47 different items are considered for each drawing.

== Validity as a measure of intelligence ==
The Draw-a-Person test is commonly used as a measure of cognitive abilities in children; it has sometimes been used to index intelligence, but this has been criticized. Kana Imuta et al. (2013) compared scores on the Draw-a-Person Intellectual Ability Test to scores on the Wechsler Preschool and Primary Scale of Intelligence in 100 children and found a very low correlation (r=0.27). However, other research found a statistically significant correlation between DAP scores and the Wechsler Preschool and Primary Scale of Intelligence – Revised, or Wechsler Abbreviated Scale of Intelligence. Although the correlation findings contradicted other studies, researchers observed a high number of false positives and negatives for low intellectual functioning, so they concluded DAP is not a reliable measure of IQ. In 2021, Troncone et al. found a similar correlation between DAP scores and Raven’s Matrices non-verbal intelligence scores, but as in the Wilcox study, high false positives and false negatives led researchers to conclude DAP is not useful as a measure of intelligence. This study also compared DAP scores to academic performance and found no correlation. This lack of a relationship between DAP scores and school performance was supported in findings from an earlier study by Scott in 1981. Similarly, results found with child and youth psychiatric inpatients failed to support the hypothesized relationship between human figure drawings and IQ. These studies suggest the Draw-a-Person test should not be used as a substitute for other well-established intelligence tests and is not an accurate predictor of academic performance.

Research consistently finds that external factors can influence scores on the DAP, and results may be correlated with other developmental skills. In addition to problems found in a single administration of the DAP test, DAP scores are also influenced by both the environment and cognitive changes that an individual experiences over time. DAP scores change with repeated administration and the introduction of new information in the instructions to the test. When determining what factors (including fine motor skills, gross motor skills, social skills, cognitive skills, and language ability) were correlated with DAP scores, researchers found that DAP is not a reliable measure of cognitive skill. In this work, scores were most closely related to the development of fine motor skills. These studies support the unreliability of DAP for intelligence measurement because of other factors that affect scores.

== Validity as a measure of emotional disturbance and mental health disorders ==
Although the DAP test is now widely regarded as unreliable for measuring intelligence or cognitive abilities, results on its use for identifying emotional disturbances or mental health disorders are mixed. Psychologist Julian Jaynes, in his 1976 book The Origin of Consciousness in the Breakdown of the Bicameral Mind, indicated that the test is "routinely administered as an indicator of schizophrenia," and that while not all schizophrenic patients have trouble drawing a person, when they do, it is very clear evidence of a disorder. Specific signs could include a patient's neglect to include "obvious anatomical parts like hands and eyes," with "blurred and unconnected lines," ambiguous sex, and general distortion. There has been no validation of this test as indicative of schizophrenia. Chapman and Chapman (1968), in a classic study of illusory correlation, showed that the scoring manual, e.g., large eyes as indicative of paranoia, could be generated from the naive beliefs of undergraduates. However, DAP:SPED was found to be moderately helpful for identifying internalized emotional issues such as anxiety and depression. Similarly, comparison of children with disruptive behavior disorders such as conduct disorder and oppositional defiant disorder and children without these disorders showed improved diagnostic accuracy by using the DAP. However, contradictory studies showed the DAP had little value in diagnosing anxiety, and that DAP scores are not predictive of emotional or social adjustment. These mixed results suggest that clinicians should be cautious when using the test to screen or diagnose emotional disturbance or mental health disorders.

== Validity as a personality test ==
A final suggested use for the DAP is as a personality test. Harris found no validity in personality testing through human figure drawing. He rejected the use of "an elaborate theory of symbolism" to interpret the stylization of features, instead preferring to let the child lead with a simple "Tell me about it" after the drawing. Research is lacking in this area, but there is no evidence to suggest DAP is useful for personality testing.
