= Florence Goodenough =

American psychologist (1886–1959)

- Born: August 6, 1886; Honesdale, Pennsylvania, U.S.
- Died: April 4, 1959 (aged 72); Lakeland, Florida, U.S.
- Scientific career
- Fields: Psychologist, professor
- Academic advisors: Leta Stetter Hollingworth

Florence Laura Goodenough (August 6, 1886 – April 4, 1959) was an American psychologist and professor at the University of Minnesota who studied child intelligence and various problems in the field of child development. She was president of the Society for Research in Child Development from 1946 to 1947. She is best known for publishing the book Measurement Of Intelligence By Drawings, where she introduced the Goodenough Draw-A-Man test (now the Draw-A-Person Test) to assess intelligence in young children through nonverbal measurement. She is noted for developing the Minnesota Preschool Scale. In 1931, she published two books, titled Experimental Child Study (with John E. Anderson) and Anger in Young Children, which analyzed the methods used in evaluating children. She wrote the Handbook of Child Psychology in 1933, becoming the first known psychologist to critique ratio IQ.

== Early life ==
Florence Laura Goodenough was born on August 6, 1886 to Alice Gertrude Day and Linus North Goodenough in Honesdale, Pennsylvania. She was the youngest child, with two brothers and six sisters. Her family was involved in farming. She was homeschooled and received the equivalent of a high school diploma.

== Academic career ==
Goodenough received her primary education at home until attending Millersville Normal School. This school had few options of careers for women, and she picked teaching. In 1908, Goodenough graduated from Millersville Normal School with a Bachelor of Pedagogy. There is not much documentation of her time at Millersville; however, it is known that after earning her degree, she moved on to teach at the University of Minnesota from 1912 to 1919. She then went back to college at Columbia University. She received a Bachelor of science in 1920, and a masters of art degree in 1921, under Leta Hollingworth. Hollingworth was a psychologist and Goodenough's mentor. In 1921, Hollingworth recommended Goodenough to Lewis Terman to become a research assistant. From 1920 to 1921, she also served as the director of research for the Rutherford and Perth Amboy public schools in the state of New Jersey. It was during her time in public schools when she actually conducted a majority of her data. Goodenough then went to Stanford University, beginning her doctoral studies by working with Lewis Terman on his Gifted Children Survey, which was later published as Genetic Studies of Genius.

Lewis originally assigned her to do field research for the paper in Los Angeles. She first served as the chief field psychologist, and then reached the higher status of chief research psychologist from 1922 to 1923, overseeing the other psychologists with her. She was listed as a contributor to Terman's book Genetic Studies of Genius; at the time, it was rare for women to be listed as contributors to research. Goodenough earned her PhD in psychology in 1924, from Stanford University. Goodenough then went to the University of Minnesota, a Child Welfare Institute, where she worked as a research professor under John E. Anderson from 1925 to 1930. Anderson and Goodenough were noted as offering some of the first undergraduate and graduate courses in developmental psychology. She then became a professor of psychology from 1931 to 1947.

== Major accomplishments ==
Goodenough studied psychology in a time where the study of nature vs. nurture was argued for what contributed more towards a child's development. Her mentor, Lewis Terman, believed nature was the more important factor for child development, arguing that the environment showed heavy influence in their personality and abilities in school. Two main areas of focus when discussing nature vs nurture effects were on a child's IQ and their emotional development. Goodenough opposed the previous well respected views, and believed it was the child's maturation that played the major role in a child's emotional development. She wanted to test the basis of fixed intelligence with the results shown through IQ testing. Defending these beliefs, she published books explaining her theories and thoughts on this in 1939–1940.

In addition to her time at the University of Minnesota, Goodenough created the draw-a-man test, used to measure intelligence in children. She published the test in Measurement of Intelligence (1926), including detailed accounts of procedures, scoring, and examples. After her publication of the draw-a-man test, Goodenough expanded the Stanford-Binet Scale for children into the Minnesota Preschool Scale in 1932. Goodenough's most significant contribution to psychology was her advancement of sampling in 1928, which would become to be known as event and time sampling, a method that is still in use in the 21st century.

Goodenough published her time sampling approach in Anger in Young Children (1931), which analyzed the methods used in evaluating children. Her time sampling technique was critiqued for using mothers as research participants, with many doubting that nonscientists would successfully record observations for a study. Goodenough's objective was to analyze John B. Watson's assertion that newborns were primarily only capable of three different emotions: rage, fear, and love. She gathered forty-one participants, ranging from infancy through seven years old, and trained the parents to use event sampling and track the outbursts of anger they saw in their children. It was through this experiment that she suggested that children who were less than one year old had the most notable triggers for anger, due to repetitive child care, minimal physical irritations, and limitations of physical movement. However, Goodenough's research findings indicated that by the time the child reached the age of four, social interactions became the most significant basis of anger. Goodenough's findings led her to theorize that it was not the environment that was most influential in emotional development, but actually maturation in young children. Overall, Goodenough's publication led to a crucial descriptive awareness for parents and professionals to help acknowledge diverse emotional inclinations in child development. This ultimately led her to continue with several more publications on child development, maturation, and emotion. Many researchers still appreciate Goodenough's publication on emotional development because of its detailed description of the methodology used. Goodenough's experiment represented one of the first large-scale analyses done through observations, and her research is still considered one of the most detailed analyses of emotional development in children.

== Women in war ==
Goodenough was an active feminist throughout her life, typified by her fight in male-dominated careers like psychology. She especially showed frustration when she and many other women were not allowed to participate in wartime jobs. The many psychology studies conducted involving the war were only being researched by men, while women were expected to volunteer in the local communities. Goodenough was the president of the National Council of Women Psychologists (NCWP), through which she fought for women psychologists to also be allowed to participate in wartime studies. She succeeded, and she and other women were able to obtain paid employment as military personnel.

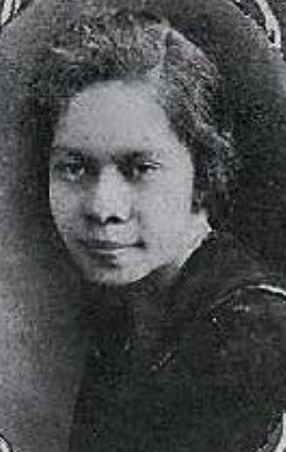
Ruth Winifred Howard, one of the first African American women to earn a PhD in psychology. She was influenced and taught by Florence Goodenough.

== Late life ==
Goodenough was never married. During her late career, Goodenough continued to publish on a variety of topics. She also was known as a great educator, and one of her students was Ruth Winifred Howard, the first African American woman to receive a PhD in psychology. However, Goodenough was forced to retire early because she developed chronic diabetes and began to go blind and deaf. She moved to New Hampshire, learned braille, then published three more books: Mental Testing: Its History, Principles, and Applications (1949); Exceptional Children (1954); and the third edition of Developmental Psychology (1959). Altogether, Goodenough published 10 texts and 26 research articles. During this period, she spent summers in New Hampshire and Lisbon, and her winters in Lakeland, Florida. She died of a stroke in Lakeland on April 4, 1959.

== IQ testing ==
Goodenough revised and invented tests for children. She studied exceptional children, child psychology, and anger and fear in children throughout her career. She published her first book: The Measurement of Intelligence by Drawings in 1926 which introduced her thoughts and ideas of children's IQ testing. In this book, Goodenough presented her IQ test for preschoolers called the Draw-A-Man test. The test evaluates subjects based on the way they choose to draw a person. Goodenough was widely recognized for the test, which functions as a nonverbal measure of intelligence. This test was initially geared towards children ages two through 13. The Draw-A-Man test eventually developed into a Draw-A-Woman Test due to critics believing many females would not necessarily be able to identify with a male.

The Draw-A-Man test measures children's' cognitive development levels. There has been no validation of the procedure as a personality test, or indeed as a test of anything other than cognitive development levels. In particular, research shows that the Draw-A-Man test does not measure IQ.

== Academic work and contributions ==
Director of research for the Rutherford & Perth Amboy public schools (1920–1921)

Research assistant in Psychology under Lewis Terman, Stanford University (1921–1925).

Assistant Professor under John E. Anderson (1925–1930)

Published her first book- The Measurement of Intelligence by Drawings (1926)

Published the Draw-a-Man test (1926)

Published Anger in Young Children and the Measurement of Mental Growth (1931)

Published Minnesota Preschool Scale (1932)

Full time professor at the University of Minnesota (1931–1947)

President of the National Counsel of Women Psychologists (1942)

President of the Society for Research in Child Development (1946–1947).

== Timeline ==
- 1886: Born in Honesdale, Pennsylvania
- 1908: Bachelor of Pedogogy (B.Pd.) earned from Normal School in Millersville, Pennsylvania.
- 1920: B.S. from Columbia University under Leta Hollingworth.
- Director of Research in the Rutherford and Perth Amboy New Jersey public schools.
- Began to document the effects of environment on intelligence test scores.
- 1921: M.A. earned from Columbia University under Leta Hollingsworth.
- First began working with Lewis Terman at Stanford University.
- 1923: Published The Stanford Achievement Test.
- 1924: PhD Philosophy earned from Stanford University under Lewis Terman.
- Worked at Minneapolis Child Guidance Clinic.
- 1925: Appointed assistant professor in the Institute of Child Welfare at the University of Minnesota.
- 1926: Published her first book: The Measurement of Intelligence by Drawings (Introduction to Draw-A-Man test).
- 1931: Published The Measurement of Mental Growth.
- Published Anger in Young Children.
- Goodenough set out to evaluate J. B. Watson's claim that newborns were initially only capable of three emotions: rage, fear and love, by comparing children's anger in infancy and in childhood. The book reported findings that children show anger at bath time, physical discomfort, and by age four, social relations were the greatest source of anger.
- Promoted to full professor in the Institute of Child Welfare at the University of Minnesota.
- 1933: Published Handbook of Child Psychology.
- 1938: Served as president of the National Council of Women Psychologists.
- 1940: Goodenough–Harris drawing test established, as revised by Florence Goodenough and Dale Harris.
- 1947: Retired early from the University of Minnesota due to physical illness.
- 1942: The Women's Army Auxiliary Corps (WAAC) solicited Goodenough's professional opinion in selection of tests to be given to Officer Candidates and Basics. Goodenough recommended the Goodenough Speed-of-Association Test. The test used free association to determine ratings of masculinity–femininity and leadership. Results from Candidates and Basics were used as norming data as the test was under construction. She was particularly interested in how results differed between women who were married, divorced, or single. She found that divorced women were more masculine and offered a greater percentage of rare responses compared to either of the two other groups. Early retirement cut short her work on this test and it was never completed.
- 1947: Appointed Professor Emeritus until her death in 1959.
- 1949: Published Mental Testing: Its History, Principles, and Applications.
- 1956: Published Exceptional Children.
- Died from a stroke at the age of 73.

== Works ==
- Goodenough, F. L. (1905). Measurement of intelligence by drawings. Yonkers-on-Hudson, NY: World Book Company.
- Goodenough, F. (1926). A new approach to the measurement of intelligence of young children. Journal of Genetic Psychology, 33, 185–211.
- Goodenough, F. L. (1931). Anger in young children. Minneapolis, MN: University of Minnesota Press.
- Goodenough, F. L. (1934). Developmental psychology: An introduction to the study of human behavior. New York, NY: Appleton-Century Crofts.
- Goodenough, F. L. (1949). The appraisal of child personality. Psychological Review, 56, 123–131.
- Goodenough, F. L. (1949). Mental testing: Its history, principles, and applications. New York, NY: Rinehart.
- Goodenough, F. L., & Anderson, J. E. (1931). Experimental child study. New York, NY: Century.
- Goodenough, F. L. (1956). Exceptional children. New York, NY: Appleton-Century Crofts.

== Sources ==
- Benjamin, L. T. (1980). Women in Psychology: Biography and Autobiography. Psychology of Women Quarterly, 5(1), 140–144. https://doi.org/10.1111/j.1471-6402.1981.tb01040.x
- Bosler, A. (2000, May). Florence Goodenough. Retrieved from http://www.muskingum.edu/~psych/psycweb/history/goodenough.htm
- Brice, N. (n.d.). Psychology: Florence L. Goodenough. Retrieved from http://faculty.frostburg.edu/mbradley/psyography/florencegoodenough.html
- Capshew, J. H., & Laszlo, A. C. (1986). "We would not take no for an answer": Women psychologists and gender politics during World War II. Journal of Social Issues, 42, 157–180. doi:10.1111/j.1540-4560.1986.tb00213.
- Harris, D. (1959). Florence L. Goodenough, 1886–1959. Child Development, 30, 305–306.
- Hartup, W. W., Johnson, A., & Weinberg, R. A. (2001). The Institute of Child Development: Pioneering in Science and Application, 1925–2000. Minneapolis, MN: Institute of Child Development, University of Minnesota.
- Johnson, A. (2015). Florence Goodenough and child study: The question of mothers as researchers. History of Psychology, 18, 183–195. doi:10.1037/a0038865
- Johnson, A. & Johnston, E. (2010). Unfamiliar feminisms: Revisiting the National Council of Women Psychologists. Psychology of Women Quarterly, 34, 311–327. Doi: 10.1111/j.1471-6402.2010.01577.x
- Jolly, J. L. (2010). Florence L. Goodenough: Portrait of a Psychologist. Roeper Review, 32:98–105. The Roeper Institute. Doi: 10.1080/02783191003587884
- Ogilvie, Marilyn Bailey., and Harvey, Joy Dorothy. The Biographical Dictionary of Women in Science : Pioneering Lives from Ancient times to the Mid-20th Century / Marilyn Ogilvie and Joy Harvey, Editors. New York: Routledge, 2000. Print.
- Plucker, J. A. (Ed.). (2003). Human intelligence: Historical influences, current controversies, teaching resources. Retrieved March 20, 2011.
- Rodkey, E. (2010). Profile of Florence Goodenough. In A. Rutherford (Ed.), Psychology's Feminist Voices.
- Thompson, D. N. (1990). Florence Laura Goodenough. In A. N. O'Connell & N. F. Russo (Eds.). Women of Psychology: A bio-bibliographic sourcebook (124–133). Westport, CT: Greenwood Press.
- Stevens, G. & Gardner, S. (1982). Florence Laura Goodenough. In G. Stevens and S. Gardner (Eds.), The Women of Psychology, Volume 1: Pioneers and innovators (pp. 193–197). Cambridge, MA.: Schenkman Publishing.
- Weiss, A. (n.d.). Florence Goodenough: 1886–1959. Retrieved from: http://faculty.webster.edu/woolflm/goodenough.html
