= APA Award for Lifetime Contributions to Psychology =

The APA Award for Lifetime Contributions to Psychology is the highest award of the American Psychological Association.

== List of recipients ==
Source: APA

- 1990 B.F. Skinner
- 1991 Neal E. Miller
- 1993 Herb Simon, Roger Sperry
- 1994 Kenneth B. Clark, Anne Anastasi
- 1996 Paul Meehl
- 1997 Carolyn R. Payton
- 2000 Raymond D. Fowler
- 2001 Janet Taylor Spence
- 2002 Richard C. Atkinson
- 2003 George Armitage Miller
- 2004 Albert Bandura
- 2005 Judith Rodin
- 2006 E. Mavis Hetherington
- 2007 Daniel Kahneman
- 2008 Edward F. Zigler
- 2009 Patrick H. DeLeon, Alan E. Kazdin
- 2010 Shelley E. Taylor
- 2011 Florence Denmark
- 2012 Kelly D. Brownell, Rena R. Wing
- 2013 Antonette M. Zeiss
- 2014 Beverly Daniel Tatum
- 2015 Jonathan Kellerman
- 2016 Eduardo Salas
- 2017 Martin E.P. Seligman
- 2018 Margaret Beale Spencer
- 2019 Derald Wing Sue
- 2020 Melba J. T. Vasquez
- 2021 Geoffrey M. Reed, Jessica Henderson Daniel
- 2022 William E. Cross, Jr.
- 2023 Beverly Greene

== See also ==
- List of psychology awards
