= Racial diversity in United States schools =

Racial diversity in United States schools is the representation of different racial or ethnic groups in American schools. The institutional practice of slavery, and later segregation, in the United States prevented certain racial groups from entering the school system until midway through the 20th century, when Brown v. Board of Education forbade racially segregated education. Globalization and migrations of peoples to the United States have increasingly led to a multicultural American population, which has in turn increased classroom diversity. Nevertheless, racial separation in schools still exists today, presenting challenges for racial diversification of public education in the United States.

== Background ==
=== Americanization / assimilation ===
The United States has a history of enforcing Americanization or cultural assimilation in its public schools. These efforts would often target immigrants, Native Americans, and other ethnic minorities. Since the country's founding, public schools were considered to be a place to learn how to be an American. With growing numbers of immigrants entering the U.S. from the 1830s to the early 20th century, supporters of Americanization felt that without an American education, citizens would be ethnocentric and society would disintegrate. One component of Americanization education is the compulsory acquisition of the English language.

==== Native American schools ====
As early as 1879, Native American day schools and boarding schools were using education to assimilate American Indians into a Christian, European culture. Missionaries established some of these schools on reservations, teaching a combination of religious and academic content. These "day schools" included the Tulalip Indian School, Cushman, and Chemawa. American Asian students also attended boarding schools like the Carlisle Indian Industrial School and the Hampton Institute. Some of these schools received federal funding.

In many Native American schools, students were forbidden from speaking their native languages and punished if they did. Past students of the boarding schools praised them for providing electricity, running water, clean clothes, food, and friendship, but criticized the lack of freedom students had in the schools.

In the early 20th century, opinions on Native American schools began to change and in the ‘20s the Department of the Interior conducted a survey, with the results published in The Meriam Report in 1928. The report noted that overcrowding in the schools and lack of financial resources was causing the spread of infectious disease and producing physically weak students who were underfed and overworked. The report also revealed abnormally high death rates for Native American students. In response to this report, the number of American Indian children enrolled in U.S. public schools grew, but it was a slow process. By the 1980s, United States curricula reflected a diversity of American Indian traditions and beliefs, thanks in part to the Indian Self-Determination and Education Assistance Act of 1975.

==== The Americanization School ====
The first so-called Americanization School was built by Irving J. Gill in Oceanside, California in 1931. Its goal was to teach Spanish-speakers the English language and American customs. Frequent immigration to the United States made the nation a racially and culturally diverse one, and many supporters of The Americanization School believed that the public school system was responsible for teaching all children American history and culture.

=== Court cases ===
==== Plessy v. Ferguson ====
The 1896 Supreme Court case, Plessy v. Ferguson, was a landmark case which established the legal precedent for “separate but equal” facilities for people of different ethnicities. The decision, which was handed down with a 7 to 1 majority vote, remained lawfully upheld until its abolishment in 1954 with Brown v. Board of Education. Justice Marshall Harlan, the lone dissenter in the decision, stated “What can more certainly arouse race hate…than state enactments, which, in fact, proceed on the ground that colored citizens are so inferior and degraded…?”

Among these facilities were public schools, often located just miles apart, which separated white and colored students. In almost all instances, schools which educated colored students were underfunded, extensively degraded, and/or lacked the necessary materials to rigorously challenge the students. It was also estimated that the amount of per capita expenditures devoted towards colored students was 40-50% lower than for white students, further deepening the educational inequality between the two ethnic groups.

One stipulation in the Court’s decision stated that the decision only applied to immediate parties before the court at that time (and possibly others who were similarly situated). Because of this detail, while that particular county could be reprimanded for discriminating against colored individuals, the decision did not necessarily extend to adjacent counties and/or cities.

==== Brown v. Board of Education ====
The Brown v. Board of Education Supreme Court case of 1954 made it illegal to segregate schools based on race. The court ruled that school segregation stunted the development of minority children. At the time of the decision, some school districts were already desegregated, but schools in Topeka were still separated by race. This decision was met with initial resistance in the Southern United States. Senator Harry F. Byrd wrote the "Southern Manifesto," which called for resistance to racial integration of schools. Most counties in the Southern United States did not fully integrate their schools until the 1970s. Some scholars believe that the Brown v. Board case slowed gradual integration that was already underway. Backlash against the Brown v. Board decision continues to play a part in the amount of “racial separation” in schools today. At the time when this case was taking place it looked to be a positive step in the right direction. Although a lot of minorities lost out on the chance to learn more about themselves from other teachers of color.

=== Tracking and race ===
The practice of tracking, or grouping students based on their abilities and perceived educational and occupational potential, began in the U.S. in the late 19th century and, in some schools, continues today. Students of lower socioeconomic classes, many of whom are Black or Hispanic, are disproportionately represented in the lower tracks. Some believe this creates a lack of diversity in the classroom and limits racial minorities’ access to quality educational resources.

== Theories ==
=== Drawbacks ===
Some experts believe that race-conscious or ethnocentric approaches to diversity in the classroom are harmful and that alternative methods, such as magnet schools and open enrollment, are more productive. They perceive little correlation between racial diversity in the classroom and the performance of minority students in schools in existing data.

Historian and affirmative action opponent Stephan Thernstrom says mandatory racial diversity can cause harm, including immoral use of race-based student assignments and white flight in public schools.

=== Benefits ===
Other researchers believe that racial and ethnic diversity in schools fosters understanding of new cultures and belief systems and dispels stereotypes, which instills empathy in students. Since the mid-20th century, researchers have found that benefits of racial diversity in schools for racial minority students include higher reading levels, increased likelihood of graduating high school, positive impact on work aspirations and higher educational attainment, greater interaction with other racial groups and creation of interracial friendships in adult life, and higher desire to live and work in racially diverse environments. They believe that diversity policies should specifically address race because the category of race remains relevant in American society today. The U.S. News & World Report gives eight main reasons why diversity is viable on the college campus. Among these reasons were “diversity expands worldliness,” “Diversity enhances social development,” “Diversity prepares students for future career success,” and diversity “increases our knowledge base.”

== Policy ==
=== Affirmative action ===
Affirmative Action policies began in the 1960s with Presidents John F. Kennedy and Lyndon B. Johnson, aiming to prevent discrimination and create diversity in school and work spaces.

In 1978, the Supreme Court ruling in Regents of the University of California v. Bakke held that saving spaces in the school for black students based solely on their race was unconstitutional. The school had set aside 16 out of 100 seats for minority students to maintain diversity in the classroom and counter societal discrimination. While some judges maintained that the use of racial group as an admissions criterion was constitutional, others felt that it violated the 14th amendment.

In 2003, Grutter v. Bollinger, regarding affirmative action policies at the University of Michigan Law School, confirmed the right of colleges and universities to use race as an admissions factor, because it would create "a compelling interest in obtaining the educational benefits that flow from a diverse student body." The specific point system University of Michigan used to rate students was ruled in need of moderation, however.

A 2013 case before the Supreme Court, Fisher v. University of Texas, argued the constitutionality of “race-conscious admissions policies” at the University of Texas at Austin after two white female applicants were denied admission in 2008. An initial ruling for the university was unsuccessfully appealed to the Fifth Circuit twice before the Supreme Court agreed to hear the case again in 2016. In a 4-3 decision, it upheld the lower court's finding that university policies held up to strict scrutiny. The 2016 case before the Court is known as Fisher II. Arguments before the courts in Fisher included whether race-neutral (or "race-blind") policies needed to be proven harmful in order for policies that acknowledge race to be considered legal.

The Supreme Court would eventually supersede its 2016 decision seven years later, with a landmark 6-2 decision in Students for Fair Admissions v. Harvard (2023) and a companion case against the University of North Carolina. The Court held that race-based admissions programs at colleges and universities receiving federal funds (except for those programs in military academies) violated the Equal Protection Clause of the Fourteenth Amendment. This effectively overruled the Fisher II decision and prohibited race-conscious admissions practices (as well as overruling part or all of the court's previous findings affirming affirmative action policies, going back to 1978).

==== Praise and criticism ====
While supporters of affirmative action believe that it makes up for disadvantages that minorities face due to institutional discrimination, others see affirmative action as “preferential treatment” that gives places in colleges and universities to unqualified students. Some people assert that affirmative action policies do not look at wealth or socioeconomic class, meaning they may not be helping the most disadvantaged minority students. This group believes that more middle and upper class minority students are admitted to universities than poor minority students.

Pell Grants are one such measure of economic disadvantage, and at elite universities, the percentage of students on Pell Grants has decreased over the years. A significant academic study found that Duke University gave major advantages in admissions to wealthy families, and only 12% of students there are on Pell Grants, compared to a much higher national average.

=== Desegregation busing ===
After desegregation of U.S. schools began in the late 20th century, racial minority and white families still primarily lived in separate neighborhoods, making it hard to foster racial diversity in schools. This led to the practice of desegregation busing. Busing caused many white students to withdraw and enroll in private schools to avoid attending “inferior schools.” For this reason, busing programs were extended to the suburbs to bring white children into inner-city schools. In Minneapolis, a program called “Choice is Yours” buses low-income, Black students to schools in affluent, mostly white suburbs. The program is praised by some scholars as successful outreach to minority communities.

==== Praise and criticism ====
Some liberals see busing as a strategy for equalizing educational opportunity and integrating public schools in the United States. Many conservatives and working-class whites oppose busing, however, because of the required intrusion of the government and racial minorities into their communities and schools. Some scholars believe busing increases racial conflict. After busing was enforced in Boston, polls showed that, while the majority of Blacks supported busing, many were against it because it evoked racist hostility towards them. Most consider the Boston busing policy a failure, while students in Los Angeles fight for their right to busing, which they say removes limits on their educational resources.

== Diversity in education in other nations ==
Limited diversity in schools was the norm in many countries until the middle of the twentieth century. Apartheid in South Africa created a racially segregated society with limited diversity in education that endured until the 1990s. Indigenous peoples in Australia, Canada and New Zealand, were also required to attend segregated schools. In many other parts of the world, patterns of settlement in cultures with a dominant ethnic majority (e.g., China, France), or class or caste systems (the U.K., India), militated against diversity in schools.

== See also ==
- Oppositional culture
- Acting White
- School violence
- White flight

General:

- Education in the United States
- Racial inequality in the United States
- Racial achievement gap in the United States
