= Margaret Beale Spencer =

American academic

Margaret Beale Spencer is an American psychologist whose work centers on the effects of ethnicity, gender, and race on youth and adolescent development. She currently serves as the Charles L. Grey Distinguished Service Professor Emerita, and the Marshall Field IV Professor of Urban Education in the Department of Comparative Human Development at the University of Chicago. Dr. Spencer's career spans more than 30 years and consists of over 115 published articles and chapters, stemming from work funded by over two-dozen foundations and federal agencies.

== Education and career ==
Margaret Beale Spencer completed a five-year Bachelor of Science (BS) in pharmacy at Temple University's School of Pharmacy, and completed post-degree clinical requirements for certification and pharmacy licensure. She received her master's degree from the University of Kansas, where she worked with developmental psychologist Frances Degen Horowitz. She went on to receive her PhD in Child and Developmental Psychology from the University of Chicago in 1976.

She taught in both the psychology and education departments at Emory University before joining the faculty at the University of Pennsylvania, where she directed the W. E. B. Du Bois Collective Research Institute as well as the Center for Health Achievement Neighborhood Growth and Ethnic Studies (CHANGES).

Since 2009, she has served as the Marshall Field IV Professor of Urban Education in the Department of Comparative Human Development at the University of Chicago. She now serves as the Charles L. Grey Distinguished Service Professor Emerita.

=== Other positions ===
- Senior Advisor on the American Psychological Association's "Task Force Report on Resilience and Strength in African American Children and Adolescents."
- Board Member and Trustee of the Foundation for Child Development.
- Member of the Editorial Advisory Board for the Journal of Black Psychology.

== Research ==
=== Master's thesis ===
Spencer master's thesis, titled "Effects of Systematic Social and Token Reinforcement on the Modification of Racial and Color Concept Attitudes in Black and in White Preschool Children," was inspired by the doll studies of Kenneth and Mamie Clark and investigated whether children's racial beliefs and preferences could be modified by incentives.

The study included 24 Black and 24 White children between the ages of 3–5, who all attended a Head Start program serving lower-class families. In the control condition, children were asked to choose between drawings of Black or White animals and children; this baseline found that the children in the study showed a 70% – 80% bias towards the White stimuli. In the experimental condition, a Black or White mechanized puppet taught the children to choose the Black stimuli by rewarding them with marbles; this intervention reduced bias towards the White stimulus to only 40%.

Spencer concluded that the children had learned implicit biases during their childhood, but that the initial preference towards White stimulus could be reversed with incentives, suggesting that initial bias was more related to learned attitudes than an internalized self-hatred as suggested by the Clarks.

=== PhD Dissertation ===
Spencer's PhD dissertation was a continuation of her master's degree work looking at racial preferences among children, but with a focus on the confidence and self-esteem of Black children that exhibited biases towards White stimuli.

Her dissertation studied 130 Black children from six preschools in the South Side of Chicago. This work determined that while the children showed significant bias against the color black and Black people, and favored the color white and White people, these attitudes were not internalized by the children, allowing them to maintain healthy self-esteem despite implicit anti-Black attitudes.

=== PVEST Theory ===
Built off of Urie Bronfenbrenner's Ecological Systems Theory, Spencer developed the Phenomenological Variant of Ecological Systems (PVEST) Theory as a framework to examine strength and resiliency, especially during the process of identity formation in adolescents. PVEST addresses the social, historical, and cultural context in which youths develop, and as well as the perceptions and self-appraisals that individuals use to form their identity.

The PVEST Theory breaks identity formation into the following five components:

1. Net Vulnerability level: history of prior experiences and coping outcomes.
2. Net stress engagement: actual experience that challenges individual's well-being.
3. Reactive coping methods: employed to resolve dissonance-producing situations.
4. Emergent identities: coping strategies are repeated, become stable, and combine with self-appraisal to form identity.
5. Life-stage, specific coping outcomes: identity affects future behavior and outcomes (self-esteem, achievement, health, etc.).

The APA Task Force on Resilience and Strength in Black Children and Adolescents describes Spencer's PVEST theory as "a seminal and important contribution to the study of resilience among African American children and youth" (p. 34) for being one of the only theories taking into account the "ecological contextual circumstances unique to youths of color in the United States" (p. 23)

=== Acting White ===
In a 2008 publication titled "What does ‘acting White’ actually mean?," Margaret Beale Spencer and Vinay Harpalani addressed John Ogbu and Signithia Fordham's widely cited "Black students' school success: Coping with the burden of 'acting White,'" which proposed the Acting White hypothesis, the idea that African-American communities devalue academic achievement because success in school is seen as an attribute of White dominant culture.

Spencer and Harpalani cite data that suggests that African-American families have just as much investment in their children's academic success, and that high-achieving African-American students have higher social status than their peers, opposite to what would be presumed under the Acting White Hypothesis.

Spencer and Harpalani also found conceptual problems with Ogbu and Fordham's approach, saying:

"… the analysis presented by Fordham and Ogbu lacks a normative, developmental perspective; it fails to view African American youth as normal, developing beings who are maturing in a hostile context of racial inequity. " [p.10]

The article concludes that Acting White is simply one of many coping response that Black youths employ and is not responsible for academic underachievement.

== Awards and recognition ==
2005: American Psychological Association's "Award for Distinguished Contributions to Psychology in the Public Interest."

2006: Awarded the Fletcher Fellowship, recognizing work that furthers the broad social goals of the U.S. Supreme Court's Brown v. Board of Education decision of 1954.

2007: Inaugural Fellow of American Educational Research Association.

2008: Elected as Member of National Academy of Education.

2011: Society for Research in Child Development's award for "Distinguished Contributions to Cultural and Contextual Factors in Child Development."

2015: Northwestern University's Honorary Doctorate "Doctor of Humane Letters."

2018: American Psychological Association's APA Award for Outstanding Lifetime Contributions to Psychology.

2018 American Association for the Advancement of Science Fellow.

2019: American Academy of Arts and Sciences Fellow.

== Selected works ==
- 2001: Spencer, Margaret Beale; Noll, Elizabeth; Stoltzfus, Jill; Harpalani, Vinay (2001). "Identity and School Adjustment: Revisiting the "Acting White" Assumption". Educational Psychologist. 36 (1): 21–30. doi:10.1207/S15326985EP3601_3. ISSN 0046-1520. S2CID 9062521.
- 1999: Spencer, Margaret Beale (1999). "Social and cultural influences on school adjustment: The application of an identity-focused.". Educational Psychologist. 34 (1): 43–57. doi:10.1207/s15326985ep3401_4. ISSN 0046-1520.
- 1994: Connell, James Patrick; Spencer, Margaret Beale; Aber, J. Lawrence (1994). "Educational Risk and Resilience in African-American Youth: Context, Self, Action, and Outcomes in School". Child Development. 65 (2): 493–506. doi:10.2307/1131398. ISSN 0009-3920. JSTOR 1131398. PMID 8013236.
- 1990: Spencer, Margaret Beale; Markstrom-Adams, Carol (1990). "Identity Processes among Racial and Ethnic Minority Children in America". Child Development. 61 (2): 290. doi:10.2307/1131095. ISSN 0009-3920. JSTOR 1131095.
- 1990: Margaret Beale Spencer; Sanford M. Dornbusch (1990). "Challenges in Studying Minority Youth". In Feldman, S. Shirley.; Elliott, Glen R. (eds.). At the threshold : the developing adolescent. Cambridge, Mass.: Harvard University Press. ISBN 0-674-05035-5. LCCN 90033784. OCLC 21373316. OL 7692033M.
- 1983: Spencer, Margaret Beale (1983). "Children's cultural values and parental child rearing strategies". Developmental Review. 3 (4): 351–370. doi:10.1016/0273-2297(83)90020-5. ISSN 0273-2297.

== See also ==
- Kenneth and Mamie Clark
- William E. Cross, Jr.
- John Ogbu
