= Acting white =

Pejorative term

In the United States, acting white is a pejorative term, usually applied to Black people by other Black people, which refers to a person's perceived betrayal of their culture by assuming the social expectations of white society. The term is controversial, and its precise meaning is hard to define; some usage focuses on success in education. It is theorized that some students in racial minority groups are discouraged from achieving in school by the negative prejudices of ethnic peers (such a view has been expressed in articles in The New York Times, Time magazine, and The Wall Street Journal) and by public figures and academics across the political spectrum.

== History of usage ==
The question of whether or not "acting white" attitudes are prevalent has been debated in academic literature. In 1986, Nigerian sociologist John Ogbu co-authored with Signithia Fordham a study that concluded that high-performing African-American students in a Washington, D.C. high school borrowed from hegemonic white culture as part of a strategy for achievement, while struggling to maintain a black identity, and the "acting white theory" was born.

Black comedian and media figure Bill Cosby used the term in what became a noted May 2004 speech when he challenged the black community against the idea that gaining education was "acting white." Don Lemon has also claimed that African-American communities are harmed by referring to use of standard English or finishing school as "acting white."

Black people accused of "acting white" are sometimes referred to as Black Anglo-Saxons, a term coined by comedian Paul Mooney.

=== Accusations of "acting white" ===
==== Barack Obama ====
In 2008, before Barack Obama's election as president of the United States, longtime activist Ralph Nader characterized the then-senator as "talking white."

Obama's presidential campaign and public image prompted a public discussion about whether he would shift the ground of critics of "acting white." Commentators John McWhorter and Stephen J. Dubner have said that it might. Yahanna of the Israelite School of Universal Practical Knowledge, described by the Southern Poverty Law Center as a black supremacist sect, did not consider Obama to be black but "African of white descent" and advised African Americans not to vote for him.

Obama strongly criticized the idea that achievement was limited to "acting white" in his keynote address at the 2004 Democratic National Convention. He said that "children can't achieve unless we raise their expectations and turn off the television sets and eradicate the slander that says a black youth with a book is acting white."

==== Russell Wilson ====
American Football player Russell Wilson came under fire in 2014 when anonymous sources alleged that the feeling in the locker room of his then team, the Seattle Seahawks, was that Wilson lacked "blackness." Mike Freeman, writing for Bleacher Report, speculated that this conflict was a possible reason for the trading of player Percy Harvin from the Seahawks to the New York Jets.

== Case studies and research ==
Not all scholars define "acting white" in the same way. Most definitions include a reference to situations in which some minority adolescents ridicule their peers for engaging in behaviors perceived to be characteristic of whites. In this scenario, they equate "white behavior" with high grades in school, a result that researchers can quantify, but the term is not limited to this.

A fundamental drawback of much of the research so far is that the people studied have been asked to rate their own popularity in the eyes of others, which naturally brings those scores into question. Roland G. Fryer, Jr. has remarked, "Asking teenagers whether they're popular is like asking them if they're having sex."

=== Fordham and Ogbu ===
In 1986, Signithia Fordham co-authored with Nigerian sociologist John Ogbu a study that concluded that high-performing African-American students in a Washington, D.C. high school borrowed from hegemonic white culture as part of a strategy for achievement and struggled to maintain a black identity. Ogbu made a related claim in his 2003 book, Black American Students in an Affluent Suburb: A Study of Academic Disengagement, concluding that black students' own cultural attitudes sometimes hindered academic achievement and that these attitudes are too often neglected.

Ogbu had earlier written in his seminal work Minority Education and Caste (1978), that school disengagement among caste-like minorities occurs because white society limits the job-success of their parents and others in their communities by a glass ceiling. In his new book, he said that non-whites "failed to observe the link between educational achievement and access to jobs".

Expressions such as "acting white" may or may not reflect black teenagers' cultural values, and their usage is sometimes counterintuitive. Ogbu (2003) himself, for instance, documented one instance where a black teenage girl with natural hair was accused of "acting white" by her black peers because "like white people, she did not have to process her hair". These kind of examples show that accusations of "acting white" are not fundamentally about black cultural attributes (although such accusations may reflect these attributes). Rather, "acting white" is just a manifestation of racial identity development for black children and teenagers, who are learning and defining for themselves what it means to be "black"—in conjunction with normal adolescent peer pressure and hassles. That is also why such accusations are less common among black adults, who have come to greater resolution regarding racial identity issues.

=== Other studies ===
In 1997 the scholars Philip J. Cook and Jens Ludwig published a report finding that blacks do not face any stronger social pressures than whites to succeed in school, nor do they have greater feelings of alienation towards education in general. They noted anecdotal and ethnographic research confirming that minority students hold these views, but they concluded that these are not inherently generalizable and do not substantially affect student behavior in the classroom. They labeled the issue "something of a distraction" from what they saw as more important educational reforms.

Though Ogbu's 1978 study's conclusion was widely discussed, a later work also challenged its validity. In 2003, sociologist Karolyn Tyson and economist William Darity, Jr., of the University of North Carolina at Chapel Hill, conducted an 18-month study at 11 North Carolina schools. The study concluded that white and black students have essentially the same attitudes about scholastic achievement, and students in both groups want to succeed in school and show higher levels of self-esteem when they do better in school. They compared attitudes identified as acting white to the normal adolescent pains experienced in John Hughes' movies.

A 2010 study by Roland G. Fryer, Jr. and Paul Torelli suggested that the phenomenon probably had little to no effect on students achieving at average levels, but might explain a significant role in the disparities between black and white students at high achievement levels. Fryer has also written that, in contrast to Fordham and Ogbu's theory, "acting white" prejudices are actually more common the more integrated the school, with historically black schools free of any effects. He found that groups such as Italian immigrants in Boston's West End and the Maori of New Zealand display similar behaviors. He concluded that there is necessarily a trade-off between doing well and rejection by your peers when you come from a traditionally low-achieving group, especially when that group comes into contact with more outsiders.

Stuart Buck, a lawyer, also explored the issue in Acting White: The Ironic Legacy of Desegregation (2010). He said that segregated black schools had featured teachers, counselors, and others of the same race as the student population, and the adults often acted as mentors to the students. Integration of many public schools since the mid-to-late 20th century may have resulted in schools in which black students perceived they were controlled or dominated by whites. A black student trying to achieve high educational success may then be considered as trying to leave the minority group.

Margaret Beale Spencer and Vinay Harpalani (2008) argue that usage of the term acting white by black teenagers does not reflect their cultural values; rather, it is a manifestation of their racial identity development, experienced in conjunction with normal adolescent hassles and peer pressure. Spencer and Harpalani employ William E. Cross' (1991) 'Nigrescence' framework and contend that black teenagers' use of "acting white" in relation to academic achievement is similar to white teenagers' use of the term nerd: the only difference is that black teenagers express it in racialized terms, as in addition to normal teenage peer pressure, they are grappling with racial identity and what it means to be "black".

== Commentary ==
Anne Arnett Ferguson, a professor at Smith College, wrote in 2001 that white culture "ruthlessly excludes African American cultural modes as relevant and meaningful", highlighting the insistence in schools of standard English over Black Vernacular English as an example.

In their 2003 study, sociologist Karolyn Tyson and economist William Darity, Jr. said that school staff and faculty who hold racist attitudes about the ability of black students use the acting white disparagement as a cover for disparities in student performance. Shelby Steele wrote in The Content of Our Character that what he identified as middle-class black values are falsely viewed by the majority of blacks as "white", while they are colorblind. He argued that this attitude is distinct from other issues of young blacks in poverty.

Clarence Page made the comparison to crab mentality on The News Hour with Jim Lehrer in 2004:

In African-American folklore, the sea crab ranks among the dumbest of creatures who also offers a valuable lesson. When you catch a bucket or a basketful, you never have to put a lid on because when one of the creatures tries to get out, the others will just pull it back in. Some of our fellow human beings aren't much smarter than that. When they see you working hard to achieve your dreams, they'll make fun of you just for trying.

Kenji Yoshino, a New York University School of Law professor, in his Covering: The Hidden Assault on Our Civil Rights (2006), criticizes social pressures to conform to mainstream white culture. He said this violated African Americans' civil rights, and they can uphold their own social distinctions. He said they should be able to freely choose to identify with white culture if they wish. In 2008, political observer John McWhorter commented, "[t]eenagers have a variety of identities open to them for trying on Anti-establishment postures. White kids can be stoners or goths. Black kids can be 'nonwhite'." He interpreted those kids as black "nerds", and stated that the acting white attitude developed as the creation of an "Other" among newly integrated African-American kids.

== See also ==
- African American Vernacular English
- Blackface
- Boba liberal
- Colonial mentality
- Crab mentality
- Ethnic option
- House Negro
- Internalized racism
- Miss Ann
- Mister Charlie
- Oppositional culture
- Oreo
- Passing (racial identity)
- Pinkerton syndrome
- Race traitor
- Racial achievement gap in the United States
- Shoneen
- Stereotype threat
- Stereotypes of African Americans
- Straight-acting
- Tall poppy syndrome
- Uncle Tom
- Uppity
- West Brit
- Wigger
- Yellow cab (stereotype)
- White adjacency
