= Jean Harvey =

Behavioral weight management researcher

Jean Harvey, PhD, RDN, is an American nutritionist. As of 2026, she is the Robert L. Bickford, Jr. Endowed Professor, the Associate Dean for Research, and the Chair of the Department of Nutrition and Food Science in the College of Agriculture and Life Sciences at the University of Vermont. Her specialty is behavioral weight management with a specific focus on technology-based programs.

== Biography ==
Harvey received her Bachelor of Science and Master of Science degrees from Pennsylvania State University. She completed her fellowship in Adolescent Nutrition at the University of Washington in 1984. She received her doctorate in epidemiology from the University of Pittsburgh in 1991, advised by Rena Wing, PhD. She has been a faculty member at the University of Vermont in the Department of Nutrition and Food Science since 1991.

== Research ==
Harvey is known for her work on technology-based weight management programs such as the Vtrim and iREACH programs. She also co-authored the Eating Well Diet book (with the editors of Eating Well magazine).

=== Technology-Based Weight Management Research ===
Harvey found that participants in the interactive television program (VTrim) were as successful at losing weight as participants in the standard in-person program, and the television approach was more cost-effective. She found that participants who received internet-based support had similar weight maintenance to those who continued to meet in person.

In the first iREACH trial, she and her colleagues compared an internet-based program (based on VTrim) to an in-person program and to a hybrid approach. They found that the internet-based approach achieved lower weight losses compared to the in-person condition, with no difference between the internet and hybrid approaches. In the second trial, they examined the potential of motivational interviewing to close the gap they found in weight loss in the first iREACH trial between weight losses in the internet-based program compared to the in-person program, but found no difference in weight losses The third trial investigates whether the addition of financial incentives for weight management behaviors and weight management outcomes will enhance online outcomes.

=== Research on Dietary Self-Monitoring ===
Harvey and colleagues compared monitoring with personal digital assistants to paper-and-pencil monitoring. They found that neither method produced better weight loss or self-monitoring adherence. In later research, they examined patterns of dietary self-monitoring in an online behavioral weight management program, and they found that different patterns of self-monitoring adherence emerged in the first four weeks of the program, such that those who had many continuous runs of self-monitoring log-ins were more likely to achieve clinically significant weight loss (>5%). In addition, they found no evidence of disparities in online dietary self-monitoring based on race or education level. In further research, theyfound that those who logged foods in a dietary monitoring website at least 2 times per day and at least 20 days within the month were more likely to achieve clinically significant weight loss (>5%).

== Awards ==
- The Eating Well Diet book, co-authored by Harvey, received the James Beard Foundation book award in the Healthy Focus category in 2008.
- Harvey received the Fulbright Senior Specialist Scholar Award in August 2012. She was hosted as a visiting scholar by the University of Newcastle and Monash University in Australia.
