= Beverly J. Vandiver =

American psychologist

Beverly J. Vandiver is an American psychologist who is the Editor-in-Chief of the Journal of Black Psychology, director of Quantitative Methodology Center in the Office of Research, Innovation, and Collaboration, and professor of Human Development and Family Sciences in the Department of Human Sciences at Ohio State University, focusing on measurement and scale development and Black racial identity. She is the lead author and developer of the Cross Racial Identity Scale (CRIS), which was developed to operationalize the expanded theory of nigrescence, is the most widely cited racial identity approach, and is used as a framework for understanding other issues of diversity including gender.

== Career ==
Vandiver has 40+ publications with 1,800+ citations, dedicating her career to validating the Cross Racial Identity Scale.

Vandiver served as an associate professor at Penn State University and became a faculty member of Western Michigan University in 2013. She is now a professor at The Ohio State University.

== Publications and awards ==
Vandiver's most notable publications include her article in the Journal of Counseling Psychology on Validating the Cross Racial Identity Scale. She worked with Dr. William Cross who originally developed the theory behind CRIS in 1971. It is the first and currently only racial identity measure for African Americans.

She was awarded the 2017 Distinguished Career Contribution to Research award from the Society for the Psychological Study of Culture, Ethnicity and Race of the American Psychological Association (APA). She was honored as having made significant contributions in research related to ethnic minority populations.

She is a Buros-Spencer Scholars
