= Alan E. Kazdin =

American psychologist (born 1977)

- Born: January 24, 1945 (age 81)
- Education: San Jose State University; Northwestern University
- Awards: Joseph Zubin Award (2008); APA Award for Lifetime Contributions to Psychology (2009); James McKeen Cattell Fellow Award (2010)
- Scientific career
- Fields: Psychology
- Workplaces: Yale University

Alan Edward Kazdin (born January 24, 1945) is Sterling Professor of Psychology and Child Psychiatry at Yale University. He is currently emeritus and was the director of the Yale Parenting Center and Child Conduct Clinic. Kazdin's research has focused primarily on the treatment of aggressive and antisocial behavior in children.

In 2008, he served as the president of the American Psychological Association.

== Education ==
Kazdin earned his B.A. in Psychology from San Jose State University and Ph.D. in Clinical Psychology from Northwestern University.

== Achievements ==
His awards include MERIT Award from National Institute of Mental Health, Lifetime Contribution Award to Psychology from the American Psychological Association and Distinguished Service Award to the Profession of Psychology from the American Board of Professional Psychology.

== Publications ==
Kazdin's 800 plus publications include 50 books that focus on interventions for children and adolescents, cognitive-behavioral treatment, parenting and child rearing, interpersonal violence, and methodology and research design. His work on parenting and child rearing has been featured on CNN, NPR, PBS, BBC World Service, and he has appeared on Good Morning America, ABC News, 20/20, The Dr. Phil Show, and the Today Show.

In addition to his own published work, Kazdin has been editor of six journals: Behavior Therapy (1979–83), Journal of Consulting and Clinical Psychology (1985–90), Psychological Assessment (1989–91), Clinical Psychology: Science and Practice (1994–98), Current Directions in Psychological Science (1999–2004), and Clinical Psychological Science (since 2012). He was editor-in-chief of the eight-volume Encyclopedia of Psychology (2000, APA/Oxford University). Also, he has edited two-book series: Developmental Clinical Psychology and Psychiatry (Sage Publications, 1983–99) and Current Perspectives in Psychology (Yale University Press, 2000–08), and co-edited a book series Advances in Clinical Child Psychology (with Benjamin Lahey, 1977–92).

=== Selected books ===
- Alan E. Kazdin (1995). Conduct Disorders in Childhood and Adolescence. Thousand Oaks, Calif.: Sage Publications, Inc. ISBN 9780803971813.
- Alan E. Kazdin, Carol D. Goodhart, Robert J. Sternberg (2006). Evidence-Based Psychotherapy: Where Practice and Research Meet. American Psychological Association. ISBN 978-1591474036.
- Alan E. Kazdin (2008). The Kazdin Method for Parenting the Defiant Child: With No Pills, No Therapy, No Contest of Wills. Houghton Mifflin Harcourt. ISBN 9780618773671.
- Alan E. Kazdin (2013). Behavior Modification in Applied Settings (7th ed.). Waveland Press. ISBN 9780534348991.
- Alan E. Kazdin (2016). Methodological Issues and Strategies in Clinical Research (4th ed.). American Psychological Association. ISBN 9781557981677.
- Alan E. Kazdin (2017). Research Design in Clinical Psychology (5th ed.). Pearson. ISBN 9780397474035.
- Alan E. Kazdin (2018). "Innovations in psychosocial interventions and their delivery: Leveraging cutting-edge science to improve the world’s mental health." New York: Oxford University Press.
- Alan E. Kazdin (2021). Single-Case Research Designs: Methods for Clinical and Applied Settings (3rd ed). Oxford University Press. ISBN 978-0195030204.
- Alan E. Kazdin: (2025) Mental Health Interventions in Everyday Life: Beyond Psychotherapy to Reduce Symptoms of Mental Disorders and Improve Wellbeing. Oxford University Press. ISBN 978-0197773680
