= Covering: The Hidden Assault on Our Civil Rights =

2006 book by Kenji Yoshino

- First edition
- Author: Kenji Yoshino
- Language: English
- Subject: Civil Rights
- Genre: Non-fiction
- Publisher: Random House
- Publication date: January 2006
- Publication place: United States
- Media type: Hardback & Paperback
- Pages: 282 pp (paperback edition)
- ISBN: 978-0-375-76021-1 (Paperback)

Covering: The Hidden Assault on Our Civil Rights, published in 2006 is an analysis on society's views on race and sexuality and a collection of autobiographical anecdotes. Kenji Yoshino, the author, is the Chief Justice Earl Warren Professor of Constitutional Law at the NYU School of Law. He wrote an article in the Yale Law Journal called Covering in 2002, but went into more detail on the subject of covering using legal manifesto and poetic memoirs. The preface of the book explains the meaning of covering:

Everyone covers. To cover is to tone down a disfavored identity to fit into the mainstream. In our diverse society, all of us are outside the mainstream in some way every reader of this book has covered. whether consciously or not, and sometimes at significant personal cost.

== An uncovered self ==
Yoshino shares personal anecdotes to help frame the larger, societal issues he covers later in the book. He explores the idea and concept of a "normal" sexuality, with most conflict occurring as an adolescent and college student. His internal struggle to accept and embrace his identity inform the beginning of covering. Afterwards, when a colleague cautions him to be "a homosexual professional" instead of "a professional homosexual", Yoshino begins to reflect on the concept of muting different identities.

Yoshino then introduces the concept of "covering," explaining:

In the new generation, discrimination directs itself not against the entire group, but against the subset of the group that fails to assimilate to mainstream norms. This new form of discrimination targets minority cultures rather than minority persons. Outsiders are included, but only if we behave like insiders - that is, only if we cover. This covering demand is the civil rights issue of our time. It hurts not only our most vulnerable citizens but our most valuable commitments. For if we believe a commitment against racism is about equal respect for all races, we are not fulfilling that commitment if we protect only racial minorities who conform to historically white norms.

Yoshino's struggles with identity took various forms, and he writes that felt "neither Japanese nor American, neither poet nor pragmatist, neither straight nor gay."

Yoshino's main source of activism concerns gay rights, and argues that the idea and need for assimilation is inherently damaging, using the gay concepts of assimilation and closeted behavior as ways to frame the conversation on civil rights.

== Part One ==
Part One deals with the "conversion", "passing" and "covering" of homosexuality: "If conversion separates ex-gays from gays, and passing separates closeted gays from out gays, covering separates normal from queers."

=== Gay Conversion ===
Homosexuality was not a very accepted trait. During the 1960s there were "voluntarily" embraced conversion therapy for the homosexual. This process created by Katz was said to "fix" someone's "problem" of homosexuality. In 1952, the first edition of the Diagnostic and Statistical Manual of Mental Disorders classified homosexuality as a psychopathologic problem. Though conversion therapy is scarce today, conversion therapists feel that Americans have been brainwashed into accepting homosexuality after such strong thoughts against the sexuality during the mid-late 1990s. To sum up the first chapter:

The gay critique of assimilation begins here. Conversion is the ultimate demand for assimilation- while passing and covering leave the underlying identity relatively intact, conversion destroys it. When someone asks for conversion, the difference between the two available refusals is immense. Which will we choose? Will we say we cannot change? Or will we, like the early gay activists, say we will not change, meeting the demands for conversion with a demand for equality?

=== Gay Passing ===
While in Oxford, Yoshino had fallen in love. The person he loved was not a woman. He had to tell his dad this. He then came out to his mom. Though they were both supportive, he knew that this was not what they wanted. Passing is best defined through the "don’t ask, don’t tell" policy, which has been in effect since the Congress and the Department of Defense put it in place in 1993. Rather than trying to change a gay person's perspective and likings, they would just ignore the fact that a person was gay. The shift from conversion to passing was gradual and did not necessarily represent an advance in society's acceptance of homosexuals, because of their overlapping. Passing was an act that his parents demonstrated. Though they accepted the fact that Kenji was gay, it was not something talked about, and more ignored from their thought of their son.

=== Gay Covering ===
Yoshino met his first boyfriend in 1995. Through the act of covering, Yoshino never brought his boyfriend to work events or talked about his boyfriend in public, when around straight people. Homosexuals see this as "straight-acting" as heterosexuals see flamboyant acts as "acting-gay." Acting "normal" or "acting-straight" is seen as covering. Though you do not doubt the fact you are homosexual, you also do not radically protest for it and show the world that you are gay. Yoshino writes:

Covering seems a more complex form of assimilation than conversion or passing. At the most basic level, it raises thornier issues of classification. I'm sometimes asked, for instance, whether I consider same-sex marriage to be an act of covering or flaunting. I think it is both.

Yoshino gives further evidence to his position through the Shahar case. This involved a lesbian losing her job deputy personnel because of her sexuality and the boss finding out of her marriage to her partner.

== Part Two ==
Part Two discusses types of covering for different situation.

=== Racial Covering ===
As a first generation Japanese American, Yoshino would go back to Japan every summer, as his parents' attempt to preserve the Japanese culture in their children. He was taught to "Be one hundred percent American in America, and one hundred percent Japanese in Japan." For Yoshino, he could not fit into either the Japanese or American. He was unsure where he was from and felt like an outcast in both situations. The most dreaded question he was asked was "Where are you from, really?"

Racial covering is very commonly seen as "acting-white". There are laws that promote the act of racial covering. In the case of Rogers v. American Airlines (1981), Renee Rogers sued because as an airport operation agent, her job prohibited her from wearing an all-braided hairstyle. This policy "disproportionately burden African-American women, with whom cornrows are strongly associated."

=== Sex-Based Covering ===
In sex-based covering there is both covering and reverse covering, being masculine when expected, while you are feminine, and vice versa. For certain jobs women were asked to be more masculine to show that they are rough, aggressive and forceful. In many workforces, women earn the respect of her co-workers by acting masculine. Sex discrimination surfaces in the courts, like the case in which Ann Hopkins sued Price Waterhouse. She was asked to both cover and reverse cover but when she could not deliver, her nomination for the partnership was taken away. She later went on to win this case and was the first person admitted into the partnership by court order.

== Part Three ==
Part Three deals with Civil Rights from the past and the present.

=== The End of Civil Rights ===
Civil Rights are ending as laws are being created to protect religion and disabilities by required accommodation. Though these civil rights were protected, minorities and sexuality were still required to be "normal," whether it was "acting straight" or "acting white". Yoshino uses the example of the Muslim being required to take off her headscarf to take a Driver's ID photograph to show the current situation with Civil Rights. Also, a student in Oklahoma was suspended for wearing a headscarf in a public school. Yoshino thought that this should be changed, and that there is no reason for groups to cover: "But now I must temper passion with realism. I believe we should adopt a group-based accommodation model to protect traditional civil rights groups from covering demands"

=== The New Civil Rights ===
To describe the new civil rights, I return to the source of my argument. What most excited me about gay civil rights was its universal resonance. Unlike other civil rights groups, gays must articulate invisible selves without the initial support of our immediate communities. That makes the gay project of self-elaboration emblematic of the search for authenticity all of us engage in as human beings, it is work each of us must do for ourselves, and it is the most important work we can do.

In the new civil rights, it is the people that are covering that must use their freedom and start to uncover themselves. The new civil rights harnesses authenticity and sees a characteristic less in a group but more in terms of our common humanity. Evidence of the shift is shown through the Supreme Court rulings in 2003's Lawrence v. Texas and 2004's Tennessee v. Lane dealing with, respectively, gay rights and disabilities.

== Reception ==
Since Yoshino argues that all people in some way try to "cover" their identities, readers have assumed this book assumes that all minorities try to "cover" their identities. That assumption can make it seem as if Yoshino thinks that all minorities are not proud of their identities and feel that they must hide it from society. Many reviews do point out the fact that it is something a lot of people do go through because society wants them to fit in a certain mold. Yoshino is said to not only pick out the obvious but opens eyes to topics that are not well looked at and "exploring how the cultural demand to cover is different than those to pass or assimilate."

The New York Times' review was titled "The Conformist." This review sums up how Kenji Yoshino lived his life. The reviews goes through the events in the book but does bring up the fact that racial covering is another strong approach to showing methods of covering: "Though sexual orientation provides Yoshino with his primary example of the difficulties of covering, he also writes perceptively about his racial identity […] 'I …flunked Japanese race'".

The New York Times also believe that the book showed a personal search that can motivate all others to find their true selves. The review in O Magazine continued to praise this book: "Who'd expect a book on civil rights and the law to be warmly personal, elegantly written, and threaded with memorable images? [T]he beauty of Yoshino's book lies in the poetry he brings to telling his own story."

Russell K. Robinson, an acting professor at UCLA School of Law, could personally relate to Yoshino's situation: he did not think the people close to him accepted his homosexuality. Throughout "Uncovering Covering", published in Northwestern University Law Review, Robinson has published his positive thoughts on Yoshino's definition and interpretation of "covering".

The book was chosen as the 2008 University of North Carolina Summer Reading Program Book. This program "is designed to provide a common experience for incoming students, to enhance participation in the intellectual life of the campus through stimulation discussion and critical thing around a current topic, and to encourage a sense of community between students, faculty and staff."

The book won the Randy Shilts Award for Gay Non-Fiction from Publishing Triangle in 2007.
