= Signithia Fordham =

American anthropologist

- Citizenship: United States
- Education: Morris Brown College; St. John's College; The American University
- Known for: "Acting White" and "Racelessness"
- Scientific career
- Fields: Psychology, anthropology
- Workplaces: University of Rochester

Signithia Fordham is a prominent anthropologist who studies the influences of race on Black students in the classroom. She began her career working with John Ogbu on her research "Acting White" and has done similar research since. Most of her research is done in the DC area, which she gives the pseudonym Capital High.

== Early life and education ==
Signithia Fordham was raised by her mother and father with numerous sisters and brothers. In the acknowledgments of her book Blacked Out, Fordham thanks her mother for "modeling Black womanhood and the life she knew awaited me." Despite having strong African American models such as her mother, Fordham mentioned how she often felt pressure to conform to a white "norm" in high school, which possibly influenced her later research Acting White

Fordham received her B.A. with honors in Social Science Education at Morris Brown College, a historically Black college with ties to the Episcopal Church, located in Atlanta, Georgia. She went on to receive an MA from St. John's College in Liberal Education and a PhD from The American University.

== Career ==
After receiving her PhD from The American University, Fordham began working with John Ogbu at the University of California, Berkeley. She went on to receive a prestigious appointment as a visiting fellow in African and African American studies at Yale University and then became the first presidential fellow in the Department of Afro-American Studies at Princeton from 1991 to 1992. In 2002, she was appointed as the Susan B Anthony Professor at the University of Rochester for her extensive research on race, gender, and identity politics. She remains a professor in the anthropology department at the University of Rochester and is known for being a challenging and extremely knowledgeable professor

== Acting White ==
Fordham was a main contributor to the creation of the framework Acting White and has published significant research, both outlining Acting White and discussing other prevalent topics for Black students in educational settings.

=== The Burden of Acting White ===
Fordham and John Ogbu published "Black Students' School Success: Coping with the "Burden of 'Acting White'"" in 1986. The study, which was widely dispersed and is still relevant today, attributed Black students' lower academic achievement to the association between doing well in school and Acting White. They argued that Black students who do well in school risk "labeling... exclusion from peer activities or ostracism, and physical assault" (183). Fordham and Ogbu also develop the potential effects of Fictive kinship, which is often pertinent in Black communities, on pressure to act or not act a certain way. They argue that one mechanism through which Black students resist acculturation is by not "acting white" which is code for the activities (studying, attending class, doing home, etc.) that tend to lead to academic achievement.

Fordham and Ogbu discuss various coping strategies which black students develop in cases of academic success to avoid ostracization such as athletic activities and team-oriented activities, as well as clowning around. The female students tend to keep a low profile, skip classes on occasion, and appear indifferent. Fordham and Ogbu concluded that an increase in opportunities for Black youth, as well as a change in Black communities and an increase in visibility of successful Black students would help to decrease the associations between Whiteness and doing well in school.

=== Obama and Acting White ===
President Barack Obama brought up the idea of "Acting White" at a Town hall meeting, and his statements were in line with the policy implications suggested by Fordham and Ogbu. He explained that it is important for Black people to get past the idea of an authentic way to be black and embrace both their culture and the complexities of their identity and values. This recommendation put the brunt of the responsibility to address "Acting White" on Black communities without recognizing the roots of how the notion of "Acting White" developed. The deeply ingrained nature of "acting white" as perpetuated by all perspectives was showcased in the aforementioned Obama speech, in which Fordham did not receive credit for her role in the Acting White research. In an article titled "Are (Black) Female Academics Ignored?" she explained that the individuals who did receive credit for the "Acting White" work were all male and affiliated with elite institutions. This demonstrates how Black women don't just choose to maintain a low profile, both academia and mainstream media ensure they are ignored. Although Fordham, Ogbu, and Obama all suggest Black communities shine a light on Black (female) academics to emphasize the value of doing well in school, how are Black communities supposed to do this when those exact people are being systemically forgotten?

=== Criticisms of Acting White ===
In Acting White, Fordham and Ogbu recognize that the relation between acting white and academic success is not causal. Furthermore, they recognize that Acting White is not understood by Blacks as doing well in school, but rather as behaviors such as studying and speaking up in class, which are associated with doing well in school. Ogbu and Fordham, as well as Obama, suggest that parents should emphasize the values of these behaviors, and highlight role models who promote such values. However, these suggestions revert to the victim-blaming ideology, where the behaviors of Black people are recognized as different, quantified as deficient, and then the brunt of the responsibility is put on the Black communities to fix the so-called "problem."

Moreover, these suggestions ask Black families and students to adapt in order to fit a Eurocentric system. Some researchers have begun to push back and challenge schools to be more inclusive of activities and classroom setups that promote and support Blackness and Black Identities. In Fordham's research "Dissin' "the Standard": Ebonics as Guerrilla Warfare at Capital High," Fordham discusses how Black students have taken on Ebonics as the Standard language, and treat Standard English as a vernacular dialect. Fordham implies that using Ebonics or standard English is a choice. She asserts that many students don't speak "standard English" because, either consciously or unconsciously, they recognize that forcing standard English is an institutionalized convention that "marginalize[s] and stigmatize[s] the Black self." Therefore, policies based on the common assumption that Black students can't speak "standard English" will never work, because they force students to perpetuate the dehumanization that occurs by devaluing Black language. Similarly, policies that focus on getting Black students to perform more behaviors associated with Whiteness will be unsuccessful to the extent they ask Black students and Black families to adopt the behaviors of the people who have historically oppressed them.

== Racelessness ==
Racelessness is the idea proposed by Fordham that high achieving Black students and Black business people alike have to distance themselves from the Black community in order to succeed in institutions dominated by White people. The more closely they remain tied to and identify with their Black communities, the less likely they can achieve vertical success, which is largely based on the individual in white capitalist culture.

=== "Racelessness as a factor in Black students' school success: Pragmatic strategy or pyrrhic victory?" ===
This article, first published in the Harvard educational review, contains a comprehensive exploration of the idea of Racelessness and how it plays out at Capital High. Fordham asks the difficult question of racelessness, if it is a "pragmatic strategy or a Pyrrhic victory?" (Fordham, 80). She acknowledges the complicated nature of this question, as for an individual it may be a pragmatic strategy, but within Black communities, where community strength and Fictive Kinship play an important role, it is a Pyrrhic victory. She leaves the question open for discussion and asks the Black community to question their relationship with institutions and the larger society. This also provides a framework for her later research, in which she develops the strengths of being Black in the classroom and begins to encourage institutions to reframe their structures to be more inclusive of Black students.

=== "'Those loud Black girls': (Black) women, silence, and gender 'passing' in the academy" ===
Fordham continued her work in Capital High School, this time exploring the strengths of "Loud Black Girls" embodying their Blackness. Her research followed Black female high school students and examined their identity formation and how the idea of "passing" related to them. "Passing" refers to the idea that women have to act in a particular way in male-dominated spaces to get by and be accepted by the general public. Similarly, Black women have to act in a quiet, subdued, and complacent way if they want to be perceived as good students. Fordham argues that Black women should express their "loudness" and rebel in the ways they see fit against the systems that have historically oppressed them. She sees this as a way of developing and maintaining ties to the Black community while making space for blackness in academia.

== Impact ==
Fordham's resistance against "Passing" falls in line with works done during the same time period within the framework of Black nationalism. In "Those loud Black Girls," Fordham argues that Black people need to redefine themselves as separate from a white standard and take pride in how they exist in the world, and further argues that it is exactly what some loud Black girls are already doing at Capital High.

Her research has looked into the different implications of being Black in a high school setting and has been greatly influential in asking people to look beyond the classic racist answers such as blacks are genetically inferior, or incapable of learning Standard English as justifications for the Achievement gap in the United States. Although her initial research focused on changing behaviors of Black students and the black community, she has evolved in her research and has helped to set the stage for research focused on the strengths of Black students, thus providing evidence for the necessity of policies that put the impetus of responsibility on the schools and teachers, rather than on Black communities.

== Notable works ==
=== Books ===
- Blacked Out: Dilemmas of Race, Identity, and Success at Capital High, 1996
- Downed by Friendly Fire: Black Girls, White Girls, and Suburban School, 2016

=== Journal articles ===
- Passin' for Black: Race, identity, and bone memory in postracial America, 2010 ISSN 1943-5045
- 'Staying Black': The demonstration of racial identity and womanhood among a group of young achieving Black Women, 2013
- Beyond Capital High: On dual citizenship and the strange career of 'acting White.', 2008 ISSN 1548-1492
- Dissin' 'the standard': Ebonics as Guerrilla warfare at Capital High, 1999 ISSN 1548-1492
- 'Those loud Black girls' (Black) women, silence, and gender 'passing' in the academy, 1993 ISSN 1548-1492
- Racelessness as a factor in Black students; school success: Prgamatic strategy of pyrrhic victory?, 1988
- Black students' school success: Coping with the 'burden of acting White', 1986 ISSN 1573-1960
