= Eduardo Salas =

American and Peruvian psychologist

- Born: Lima, Peru
- Awards: APA Award for Lifetime Contributions to Psychology (2016)

Academic background
- Education: Florida International University; University of Central Florida; Old Dominion University
- Thesis: Facilitating and hindering factors in implementing managerial technology : a socio-technical system process (1984)

Eduardo Alejandro Salas Garcia is an American and Peruvian industrial and organizational psychologist and human factors researcher. He is the Allyn R. & Gladys M. Cline Chair Professor in the Department of Psychological Sciences at Rice University. Salas was a senior research psychologist and head of the training technology development branch of the Naval Air Warfare Center's Training Systems Division.

== Career ==
=== Navy ===
Salas was born and raised in Lima, Peru. After completing his PhD from the Old Dominion University in 1984, he joined the United States Navy as a senior research psychologist and head of the Training Technology Development Branch of the U.S. Naval Air Systems Command in Orlando. During his time with the Navy, he also taught at Old Dominion University.

=== UCF ===
Salas was appointed a Pegasus Professor in Psychology at the University of Central Florida (UCF) in 2008. In this role, he continued to study the use of simulation and teamwork training as a University Trustee Chair. By 2011, he had published over 300 journal articles and served as president of the Society for Industrial and Organizational Psychology and Human Factors and Ergonomics Society.

During the 2012–13 academic year, Salas received numerous awards and honors from academic societies. In June, Salas was presented with a Distinguished Professional Contributions Award from the Society of Industrial and Organizational Psychology for "contributions to the practice of industrial and organizational psychology." A few months later, Salas was honored with the Interdisciplinary Network for Group Research's Joseph E. McGrath Award for Lifetime Achievement in the Study of Groups for "scholarly contributions to the understanding and improvement of team performance." In October, Salas won the $50,000 Michael R. Losey Human Resource Research Award from the Society for Human Resource Management, the HR Certification Institute, and the SHRM Foundation as an expert "whose research significantly advances the field of human resource management." During the same month, he also won a $1.2 million grant from NASA to do research on teamwork training for the purpose of sending a crew of astronauts to Mars by 2030.

=== Rice ===
In 2015 Dr. Salas joined the Rice University faculty in Houston, Texas. As the Allyn R. and Gladys M. Cline Chair and Professor of Psychology at Rice, he was the recipient of the 2016 American Psychological Association’s Award for Outstanding Lifetime Contributions to Psychology. During the COVID-19 pandemic, Salas published a book titled Teams That Work: The Seven Drivers of Team Effectiveness. He is a recipient of the Association for Psychological Science (APS) Lifetime Achievement Award.
