= Beverly Greene (psychologist) =

American psychologist and academic

- Born: 1950 (age 75–76); East Orange, New Jersey
- Occupations: Clinical psychologist; professor
- Organizations: AWP; APA

Academic background
- Education: Adelphi University; New York University

Academic work
- Discipline: Clinical psychology
- Institutions: St. John's University; NYC Board of Education; Kings County Hospital Center
- Main interests: Intersectionality of social identities; racism; sexism

Beverly Greene (born 1950) is a professor in the Department of Psychology at St. John's University. She is a clinical psychologist known for her work on sexism, racism, and analyzing the intersectionality of social identities. As a specialist in the psychology of women and of gender and racial issues in the practice of psychotherapy, Greene has also created many public health frameworks for understanding mental health in marginalized communities. She is the author of close to 100 psychological literature publications. Greene is involved with the Association for Women in Psychology and the Society for the Psychology of Women. She is one of sixteen women to have received the Distinguished Publication Award (DPA) from the Association for Women in Psychology in 2008.

== Background ==
=== Childhood ===
Greene was born in 1950, in East Orange, New Jersey. Greene is the oldest of 4 children: Sandra, Samuel and Lawrence. Her parents are Samuel and Thelma Greene. Both parents were raised in the South, and her father worked as a carpenter and left school in the 8th grade. Her mother finished high school, and eventually worked in a public school with disabled children. Her grandmother, aunts and uncles also lived with her family. Beverly Greene attributes her parents for instilling in her a critical awareness of racism.

=== Adulthood ===
Greene earned her undergraduate degree at New York University in 1973. After being denied from Derner the first time she applied, Greene attended the doctoral program in educational psychology at Marquette University before she was diagnosed with a benign brain tumor. Later, Greene found out she had a second tumor that required extensive surgery to remove the growth. This resulted in Greene withdrawing from her classes.

She continued on to complete both her masters (1977) and doctorate (1983) in clinical psychology at the Derner Institute of Advanced Psychological Studies, Adelphi University, being one of the only five students of color when she graduated in 1983. During her doctorate, Greene worked at Kings County Municipal Hospital Inpatient Child Psychiatry Division in Brooklyn. Her mentor, Dorothy Gartner, encouraged Greene to teach courses to other interns.

== Academic career ==
=== Psychiatry ===
Greene's first job was working for the New York City Board of Education as a psychologist. Later, in 1982, Greene started working at the Inpatient Child Psychiatry Division at Kings County Municipal Hospital in Brooklyn, New York where much of the staff was predominantly white. Many of the clients she served were poor African American children.

Greene has also owned her own therapeutic practice since 1984. As of 2019, she is still practicing clinical psychology at her clinic and teaching at St. Johns University. Greene attributes her therapeutic success to her supervisor, William Johnson. Through him, Greene learned about the importance of ingraining cultural awareness into the therapeutic approach. She also credits Johnson heavily for her writing on the uses of psychodynamic approaches to psychotherapy.

=== Teaching ===
When working in the Inpatient Child Psychiatry Division at Kings County in 1991, Greene was mentored by Chief Psychologist Dorothy Gartner. Garter encouraged Greene develop courses for her coworkers on how to treat and serve the minority population. It was here that she first became interested in teaching and writing on the topic of psychotherapy and cultural diversity.

Greene continued her teaching career at St. John's University in Queens. Greene attributes her success in this position to the encouragement she received from department chair Jeffery Fagen and Dean David O'Connell. She was the first tenured professor that was African American when she graduated in 1995.

=== Research/Writing ===
Greene began writing about her courses when working at the Inpatient Child Psychiatry Division in Brooklyn. While she was working under Chief Psychologist Dorothy Gartner and teaching courses to her coworkers, she began writing about her seminars. Greene credits her superior and other colleagues on their encouragement for her to write on the topic of psychotherapy in marginalized African American, LGBTQIA+ communities and develop inclusive public health frameworks in feminist psychology.

Currently, she is the author of almost 100 publications, hundreds of professional presentations, and 11 books, with one as recent as 2013. Greene has also been awarded over 27 national awards.

Additionally, Greene was recently named as a founding co-editor for the St John’s Institute for Critical Race and Ethnic Studies journal.

=== Non-profit Work ===
When working at the Inpatient Child Psychiatry Division, Greene also became involved in the American Psychological Association, APA’S Division 35, and the Association for Women. Greene was also a founding member of APA's Division 44 while involved with APA.

== Research ==
Greene has several publications stemmed around lesbian, gay, and bisexual psychology, along with feminism. Her main focus has been on the complexities of the human identity, believing that the framework of a person should not be limited to a strict gender. Greene's advancement in psychology has shown people should not be marginalized based on race, gender, or sexual orientation. Greene's work focuses mainly on the therapeutic approach, and often the intersection of sexism and racism.

=== Sexism ===
Greene analyzes the interaction between sexism and the history of racism to acknowledge the effects on women of color. She notes that women's experiences of oppression are not inherently hierarchical, but rather may differ phenomenologically. Greene believes that women live their lives shaped by gender-based social inequalities causing psychological conflicts and demoralization from the unequal social position. She argues that the convergence of gender, race, and sexual orientation shapes the social inequality women of color endure day-to-day.

Greene suggests clinicians working with people of color, specifically African-American women, should take precautions to not prematurely dismiss complaints about racist and sexist discrimination. Such responses can minimize the client's distress and cause further issues.

=== Racism ===
A large portion of Greene's work unpacks the complexities of incorporating race-awareness into the therapeutic process. Greene asserts that racism is a trauma, but one that cannot be understood through the PTSD model. Instead, she asserts that racism needs to be perceived through the lens of the individual during the therapeutic process. Greene does not believe that there is one therapeutic blueprint to use for racism during therapy and instead believes that understanding an individual's identity, history, and family will inform the therapist on the best treatment methods. Greene often cites the importance of training therapists to be culturally-aware and capable of embracing their own ignorance and gaps in knowledge.

Greene's work focuses mainly on the therapeutic assessment period during which the therapist begins to understand the individual's experience with racism and relationship to their own race. In Greene's article, "African American Lesbian and Bisexual Women", Greene gives four specific methods to enhance this process. First, to unpack the individual's relationship with the dominant culture. Second, to unpack the individual's relationship with their own culture. Third, to understand the individual's relationships on both an individual and institutional level. Lastly, Greene cites the importance of understanding how the individual perceives their own identity.

== Publications ==
=== Books ===
==== Psychologists Desk Reference ====
Greene et al. (2013) presents a resource for mental health practitioners in the Psychologist’s Desk Reference. The authors consider many dimensions to advise psychologists in their day-to-day practice. Unlike many of Greene's other work, this book serves as a blueprint for clinical practitioners, and is less theoretical than many of her other works.

- Beverly Greene; John C Norcross; Gerald P Koocher co-editors, Psychologists Desk Reference, 3rd ed. Oxford University Press, 2013. ISBN 9780199845491

==== A Minyan of Women: Family Dynamics, Jewish Identity and Psychotherapy Practice ====
This book unpacks the complexities of the Jewish identity, and the tools that therapists can use to better support their Jewish clients. The book focuses largely on the importance of family and personal identity. Similar to Greene's other work, the book attempts to construct models for better understanding the individual, rather than the collective group.

- Greene, Beverly, and Dorith Brodbar. A Minyan of Women: Family Dynamics, Jewish Identity and Psychotherapy Practice. London: Routledge, 2011. ISBN 9781315874708

==== Lesbian and Gay Psychology: Theory, Research, and Clinical Applications ====
Lesbian and Gay psychology explores a variety of studies including parenthood as a gay/lesbian person, the development of sexuality and gay/lesbian relationships, and self-esteem relating to sexuality. The book is meant to serve as an aid for social service practitioners as it serves as a lens for understanding gay men and lesbian women holistically during the therapeutic process.

- Greene, Beverly, and Gregory M. Herek, co-eds. Lesbian and Gay Psychology: Theory, Research, and Clinical Applications. Newbury Park (CA): Sage, 1994. ISBN 9780803953123

=== Other publications ===
- Greene, B. (1985). Considerations in the treatment of Black patients by white therapists. Psychotherapy,22,389-393.
- Greene, B. (1993). Human diversity in clinical psychology: Lesbian and gay sexual orientations. The Clinical Psychologist: Publication of the Division of Clinical Psychology of the American Psychological Association,46,2,74-82.
- Greene, B. (2005, Dec.). Psychology, Cultural Diversity & Social Justice: Beyond heterosexism and across the cultural divide. Invited paper. Journal of Counseling Psychology Quarterly,18,4,295-306.
- Greene, B. (2011). From Slave to Midwife: Healing in the Midst of Social Injustice. In L. Comas-Diaz & Weiner, M. B. (Eds.), Women Psychotherapists: Journeys in Healing(pp. 57–72). New York: Jason Aronson.

== Honors ==
- In 1995 and 2010, Greene was awarded the Women of Color Psychologies Publication Award from the Association for Women in Psychology.
- In 2008, she won the Distinguished Publication Award (DPA) from the Association for Women in Psychology in 2008.
- The American Psychological Association awarded Greene with the Outstanding Achievement Award-Committee on Lesbian, Gay & Bisexual Concerns Award in 1995.
- In 2000, Greene was awarded the Heritage Award from the American Psychological Association.
- The National Multicultural Conference and Summit awarded Greene the Dalmas Taylor Award in 2007.
- In 2011 and 2013, Greene received the American Psychological Association Presidential Citation Award.
- Received the American Psychology Association (APA) 2023 Award for Outstanding Lifetime Contributions to Psychology.
