= John Ogbu =

Nigerian-American anthropologist (1939–2003)

- Born: John Uzo Ogbu; May 9, 1939; Onicha, Ebonyi State, Nigeria
- Died: August 20, 2003 (aged 64); Oakland, California, U.S.
- Spouse: Marcellina Ada Ogbu
- Children: 5

Academic background
- Education: University of California, Berkeley

John Uzo Ogbu (May 9, 1939 – August 20, 2003) was a Nigerian-American anthropologist and professor known for his theories on observed phenomena involving race and intelligence, especially how race and ethnic differences played out in educational and economic achievement. He suggested that being a "caste-like minority" affects motivation and achievement, depressing IQ scores. He also concluded that some students did poorly because high achievement was considered "acting white" among their peers. Ogbu was also involved in the 1996 controversy surrounding the use of African American Vernacular English in public schools in Oakland, California. The 2000 book Eminent Educators: Studies in Intellectual Influence focused on him as one of "four intellectual giants of the 20th century."

== Early life and education ==
Born in the village of Umudomi, in Onicha Local Government Area, Ebonyi State, Ogbu attended Hope Waddell Training Institute and Methodist Teachers' Training College where he taught Latin, mathematics, and geography. He enrolled at Princeton Theological Seminary with the intention of becoming a minister in Nigeria but soon transferred to the University of California, Berkeley to study anthropology. At Berkley he earned his baccalaureate in 1965, his master's degree in 1969, and his Ph.D. in 1971. He taught at UC Berkeley from 1970 until his death.

== Involuntary minorities ==
Ogbu argues that cultural differences alone cannot account for differences in minority education, since some minority communities do quite well and others do not. In addition, he observes that in some cases groups of people of the same race but located in different countries manifested different ability and/or achievement levels according to some measures.

Ogbu points out that there are two kinds of differences between cultures. There are primary differences, which existed before cultures came into contact with each other. Then, there are secondary differences, which come into existence when two cultures interact with each other. He says that many of these secondary differences are created by subordinate groups in opposition to the cultural references of the dominant group.

In the U.S. context, Ogbu concluded that among U.S. Americans there are "voluntary minorities" (groups of immigrants who chose to come to the United States, and their descendants) versus "involuntary" or "caste-like" minorities (descendants of groups of persons who found themselves in the United States, or under United States jurisdiction, against their will). Voluntary minorities (e.g. Korean-Americans) tend to manifest non-oppositional secondary differences with the dominant culture. On the other hand, involuntary minorities (e.g. Native Americans) tend to manifest oppositional secondary differences with the dominant culture. However, both voluntary non-oppositional cultural subjects and involuntary oppositional cultural subjects are required to adhere to dominant (white) American cultural frames of reference if they want to acquire upward social mobility.

In Minority Education and Caste (1978), Ogbu argued that involuntary minorities often adopted an oppositional identity to the mainstream culture in response to a glass ceiling imposed or maintained by white society on the job-success of their parents and others in their communities. Therefore, he reasoned, some non-whites "failed to observe the link between educational achievement and access to jobs."

Often, the oppositional culture/identity created by the involuntary minority involves the incorporation of attitudes, behaviors, and speech styles that are stigmatized by the dominant group, which, of course, precludes those who adopt the manifestations of the oppositional culture from external success in the dominant culture. When immigrant minorities (voluntary minorities) acquire the language of the dominant culture, it is seen as an addition to the first language (non-oppositional primary differences). However, when nonimmigrant minorities (involuntary minorities) acquire the language of the dominant culture, it is the negation of their oppositional culture, and thus their cultural reality.

== Acting white ==
In 1986 Signithia Fordham co-authored, along with Ogbu, a study which concluded that some African American students in a Washington, D.C., high school did not live up to their academic potential because of the fear of being accused of "acting white." Ogbu further echoed these findings in his 2003 book Black American Students in an Affluent Suburb: A Study of Academic Disengagement (which summarized his nine-month research on the educational gap between white and African-American students in the Shaker Heights City School District located in the upscale Cleveland suburb of Shaker Heights, Ohio). His book presents a cultural-ecological theory which highlights two sets of factors that shape minority students’ academic performance: 1) the system (the way society and institutions have historically treated and do treat minorities) and 2) community forces (how minorities respond to and interpret their treatment, which is highly dependent upon their unique history and minority status in America). He concluded that these students' cultural attitudes hindered their own academic achievement and that these attitudes are too often neglected by parents, educators and/or policymakers.

Though the study's conclusions gained a popular foothold and have been espoused by such noted figures as Bill Cosby, a later study obtained different results. In 2003, Karolyn Tyson, a sociologist, and William Darity Jr, an economist, both at the University of North Carolina at Chapel Hill, directed an 18-month study at eleven North Carolina schools which found that white and black students have essentially the same attitudes about scholastic achievement; students in both groups want to succeed in school and show higher levels of self-esteem when they do better in school. The results of this study have been published in a book by Stanford sociologist Prudence Carter

A 2006 study titled An Empirical Analysis of "Acting White" by Roland G. Fryer, Jr. at Harvard University and Paul Torelli suggested that the phenomenon has a statistically significant effect on black student achievement, but only in certain school contexts. In public schools with high interracial contact and among high achieving students, there was an effect, but there was little or no effect in predominantly black or private schools.

== African American Vernacular English ==
In 1996, Ogbu played a prominent role in the debate about the utility of African American Vernacular English. As a member of a task force on African American education in Oakland, California he noted that linguists (e.g., William Labov, John Rickford, Walt Wolfram, and others) have long distinguished between the "standard" or "proper" English required in the classroom and black vernacular English spoken at home and with peers. Ogbu encouraged teachers to become familiar with and to make use of this variety (called "Ebonics" by the Oakland Unified School District) in helping speakers of African American Vernacular English acquire Standard American English in addition to their "home" variety.

== Awards ==
- 1979, Margaret Mead Award from the Society for Applied Anthropology.
- 1997, Elected Chancellor's Professor at University of California, Berkeley.
- 1997, Elected Fellow of the International Academy of Education.
- 1998, Distinguished Contributions to Research in Education Award from the American Educational Research Association.

== Death ==
He died in 2003 after suffering from a post-surgery heart attack at the Kaiser Permanente Oakland Medical Center. He is survived by his wife, Marcellina Ada Ogbu, and his children Elizabeth, Nnanna, Grace, Cecilia, and Christina. He was buried in Nigeria.

== See also ==
- List of people from Ebonyi State
