= White adjacency =

Concept within critical race theory

White adjacency is the premise that some groups of non-White people are aligned with White people and that this adjacency gives them special privileges that are denied to people who are not white adjacent.

Non-white people may be considered white adjacent by choice or by cultural factors that have stereotyped them as white adjacent, such as the model minority stereotype. Conversely, white adjacency can be sought by non-Black minorities who want to distance themselves from Black people. Mixed-race black people may, however, seek white adjacency. Asian Americans are often viewed as the most white adjacent minorities.

== United States ==
In the United States, critical race theorists increasingly view East Asians as white adjacent.

However, according the Brookings Institution, 63% of Asian American respondents identify as people of color and 76% perceive their status as closer to people of color, suggesting that Asian Americans as a whole do not see themselves as white adjacent.

Diversity within white spaces is rarely represented by Black people, which some critical race theorists view as driving a wedge between minority communities by incentivizing Asians to retain their special status while reinforcing stereotypes. However, some Black people may present themselves as white adjacent, presumably to enjoy the benefits of whiteness. Such people are typically light-skinned enough to pass as White or anything but Black.

== See also ==
- Critical race theory – Conceptual framework
- Passing (racial identity) – When a person classified as one race is accepted as another
