= William E. Cross Jr. =

American psychologist and theorist of Black identity

- Born: William E. Cross Jr. February 6, 1940; Evanston, Illinois-United States
- Died: December 5, 2024 (aged 84)
- Education: University of Denver (BA); Princeton University (Ph.D)
- Known for: Clinical psychology, nigrescence model, racial identity development
- Awards: APA Award for Lifetime Contributions to Psychology (2022)
- Scientific career
- Fields: Clinical psychology Africana Studies
- Workplaces: Princeton University, Cornell University, Penn State University, City University of New York, University of Nevada-Las Vegas, University of Denver

William Edward Cross Jr. (February 6, 1940 - December 5, 2024) was a theorist and researcher in the field of ethnic identity development, specifically Black identity development. He is best known for his nigrescence model, first detailed in a 1971 publication, and his book, Shades of Black, published in 1991. Cross's nigrescence model expanded upon the work of Black psychologists who came before him and created an important foundation for racial/ethnic identity psychology. It has proved a framework for both individual and collective social change. Throughout his career, Cross has been concerned with racial/ethnic identity theory and the negative effects of Western thought and science on the psychology of Black Americans, specifically the need for “psychological liberation under conditions of oppression.”

== Biography ==
Bill Cross, born in Evanston, Illinois, the son of Bill and Margaret Cross, attended McCosh Elementary School in Chicago. He graduated from Evanston Township High School (ETHS) in Evanston in 1959. Four of his siblings also attended ETHS but Bill was the only one of them to attend college.

Cross received a BA in psychology from University of Denver in 1963. While at DU, Cross was the President of the CO Alpha Beta chapter of Pi Lambda Phi fraternity. Here, he met Badi Foster, who would later become his best man and lifelong friend and mentor. While at DU, Cross seriously questioned his religious beliefs and eventually denounced God because he couldn't explain slavery or the Holocaust. These revelations influenced his later work, especially the transition stage of his model (Immersion-Emersion). Cross worked on his masters in clinical psychology at Roosevelt University in Chicago, where he became familiar with the stages of therapy during clinical training. Although he never completed his master's degree, this therapy-process perspective influenced his later work and is evident in his work with process and developmental stage. It is also important to note that during this time (the 60's), there was a resurgence of Black nationalism, forging the way for a Black Power Movement. This politically heated timeframe set the stage for, and encouraged, Black professionals to realize their roles within a traditionally White-oriented professional environment, and to begin to openly question the White-dominance in many fields. Around this time, in 1968, the Association of Black Psychologists (ABP) was founded, and its members came “to the realization that they are Black people first and psychologists second.”

Cross's encounter, in accordance with the nigrescence model, was the death of Martin Luther King Jr. on April 4, 1968. After this, Cross was ensnared in the Black Consciousness Movement, which largely influenced his formulation of the nigrescence theory, a theory that explained the variance of identities and how this related to the fluctuation that accompanies social movements. During the Vietnam War, Cross became the Director of West Side Service Center (WSSC) in Evanston, IL. With the Black Power Movement in full swing, Cross was put in charge of creating proactive programs to engage the youth of Evanston. During this time, he regularly attended OBAC (Organization of Black American Culture) meetings. Cross relates that at these meetings, he learned the importance of culture consciousness, not just race consciousness, an idea that would become influential in his model of race and cultural identity conceptions. He also claims to have learned much about the conversion process through his interactions of Jimmy Reid, who organized a second-tier Black Panther organization, and happened to share office space with the WSSC staff. He saw that black identity conversion transcended social class, and learned that the “identity must be complemented by material change or else one is forced to fall back on a survival mode.” Cross describes that his role as Director of West Side Service Center corresponded to his Immersion-Emersion experience.

On recommendation from his college friend Badi Foster, Cross served as assistant to the Chair of Afro-American Studies at Princeton University starting in the summer of 1969. At Princeton, Foster helped Cross make the connection between psychology and African American Studies. Badi, along with his Princeton colleagues, urged Cross to write about his ideas that there was a process through which Black men and women underwent which had stages involving anger (which was largely portrayed in media messages at the time), and that these stages were passing, and not identities in and of themselves.

While at Princeton, Cross was introduced to Dawn Monique Jackson, Princeton's Assistant Director of Admissions, and the two eventually married. The couple had a rocky initial 15 years of marriage, including constant disputes that eventually led to their separation for 5 years. Before filing for a divorce, however, they came back together and were reunited with their only daughter. They have been married 40 years now and are happily married. Their only daughter, Tuere Binta Cross, now holds a MSW degree from NYU and is currently employed as a social worker in Denver.

During his time at Princeton, Cross began meeting with William S. Hall, one of America's most accomplished black psychologists, who was just starting his career as a psychologist at the time. After discussing his ideas, Hall helped Cross devise ways to empirically test his model. The items that they created for a Q-sort experiment would eventually influence the first version of the Racial Identity Attitude Scale (RIAS). “The Negro-to-Black Conversion Experience: Toward a Psychology of Black Liberation” was published in the July 1971 issue of Black World, Hoyt Fuller's journal, based in Atlanta. With pressure building against the Black Movement in the 1970s, Fuller was eventually forced to shut down Black World. Shortly thereafter, Bill Hall published the results of his empirical study in 1972, which was later referred to as the Hall-Cross Model. In 1976, Cross completed doctoral studies in psychology at Princeton University.

After graduating from Princeton, Cross became an assistant professor at Cornell University in the summer of 1973, where he taught black studies and psychology. Although he began his career as a “social experimental psychologist” at Cornell, he left as a cultural psychologist 21 years later. Cross relates, “As a cultural psychologist, my work examines the cultural, historical, and economic forces shaping human development and everyday psychological functioning in general, and black identity development and functioning in particular.” Cross published Shades of Black in 1991, which was largely a tribute to his experiences at the Africana Center at Cornell. He published this text with the help of Henry Louis Gates Jr., who motivated him to write the book, and Robert L. Harris who introduced him to Janet M. Francendese, a senior editor at Temple University Press. Cross relates that this book was his attempt to refocus black psychology away from that of self-hatred and the social pathology model which had largely prevailed during this time, and bring attention to the variability of one's identity and the phenomenon of identity transformation. It largely emphasized the impossibility of describing the black identity as if it were a singular identity or "type". There is no singular all-encompassing definition of what it means to be black. Through this work, Cross relates that he "discovered major shortcomings in [his] original Nigrescence Model", and so the second part of Shades of Black includes a revised version of his 1971 Negro-to-Black Conversion Model.

Cross left Cornell in 1994 for a position at Pennsylvania State University, where graduate student Peony Fhagen-Smith expanded Cross's perspective to a lifespan perspective. More recently, Cross's own daughter, Tuere Cross, has further expanded this line of research. While at Penn State, Cross assembled a research group that experimentally tested and validated the Cross-Racial-Identity-Scale (CRIS), which has become one of the most widely used social identity measures employed by the Division 45 scholars. The CRIS allows for the measurement and operationalization of identity-concept. Cross left Penn State in 2000 to become a part of the Social Personality Psychology Program at the Graduate Center of the City University of New York (CUNY). In 2008, Cross was awarded emeritus status at CUNY, and he continues to serve on dissertation committees in social-personality and developmental psychology for doctoral students at the Graduate Center there.

Cross briefly lived in Henderson, NV while he served as Counselor in Education at the University of Nevada–Las Vegas. After retiring, Cross and his wife moved to Colorado, although Cross did not remain retired for long. He is the former Coordinator for the Higher Education Program in the Morgridge College of Education at the University of Denver. He also currently serves as the President Elect of the Division 45 (Society for the Psychological Study of Ethnic Minority Issues). In this role, Cross leads the American Psychological Association group to “encourage research on ethnic minority issues and [apply] psychological knowledge to ethnic minority issues”. The American Psychological Association holds an annual convention, and Cross plans on attending the upcoming 2014 convention, which will take place in Washington D.C. At the convention, it is Cross's goal to emphasize two key topics: (1) the mass incarceration of people of color, and (2) the lived experience of LGBT people of color. One of the major focuses of the Division 45 is highlighting the roles of women, gay and lesbians, and people with disabilities within the American Psychological Association. In a recent review, Cross commented, “I feel very fortunate to have lived the life I’ve led. I’ve been married for over 40 years, with a daughter who lives in Denver; so moving to Denver has reunited our family.” In fact, Cross and his daughter have co-authored two different works, one on self-concept and the other employing a lifespan perspective to look at racial identity development. It has been rumored that Cross and his daughter may write a new article about the role of spirituality and personality development.

Cross died on December 5, 2024 in Denver, Colorado.

== Writings ==
=== The Negro-to-Black Conversion Experience (1971) ===
Cross relates the transition of the Black identity through a five-stage theory of acquisition of Black identification. He called this theory Nigrescence, which is translated as: “the process of becoming Black." The five stages progress as follows:

1. Pre-encounter
2. Encounter
3. Immersion/Emersion
4. Internalization
5. Internalization-Commitment

The pre-encounter stage describes the identity before the encounter, and thus refers to the initial being or frame of reference that will alter upon facing the encounter. In this stage, one is unaware of his/her race and the social implications that come with it.

According to Cross, people of color are socialized to perceive an unracialized reference frame and are thus resistant to any information that threatens this unracial perspective. In the encounter stage, individuals undergo an experience that suddenly and sharply calls race into perspective and is generally an awakening to racial consciousness. This encounter makes the individual vulnerable to a new racialized worldview. Oftentimes, this occurrence is easily recalled as the first time a child was treated differently because of the color of his/her skin.

The third stage, immersion-emersion, the individual acts as though he/she has “just discovered Blackness.” This individual often becomes adamant in “proving that one is black,” while taking an apparent pride in their blackness and simultaneously disparaging White culture. One becomes more consciously involved with members of his/her own ethnic group to the exclusion of those from other groups. This stage is often marked by a full-fledged immersion into Black culture and a Black reference frame, and a subsequent emersion from the oversimplified, and often racist immersion experience that floods the early part of this stage. Eventually, the individual's highly emotional response to the encounter begins to plateau and this “psychological defensiveness” is replaced by “affective and cognitive openness,” which allows for a more critical analysis and worldview formation.

The internalization stage is marked by an individual's comfort with rejoining society with a strong enough sense of his own racial/ethnic identity to be able to forge relationships with members from other racial/ethnic groups. In this stage, the individual is able to begin resolving conflicts between their worldview prior to the encounter and after the encounter. Prior to this stage, the individual is insecure about his self-identity; for instance, a Black person may have concerns with whether he/she is “Black enough,” according to his internal representation of what it is to be a good Black person. This racial/ethnic anxiety often leads to the rejection of other racial groups, accompanied by an over simplistic and stern code of Blackness, rather than a positive affirmation of pro-Black ideas and actions.

The final stage of the identity transition, internalization-commitment involves reaching a balance of comfort in one's own racial/ethnic identity as well as the racial/ethnic identities of others. This stage makes the distinction between individuals who have internalized their new identity but discontinue their involvement in the movement for social change, and those that have internalized their identity and continue to be agents of social change. For a “successful” transition into this stage, the individual must become their new identity, while engaging in meaningful activities to promote social equality and political justice for their group members.

Throughout one's life one may revisit different stages and repeat steps of this process and reformulate their racial identity and opinions. Repeating stages is not a regression but often a part of greater process of integrating new information and reevaluating ideas from a more mature standpoint.

=== Shades of Black (1991) ===
In Shades of Black, which was published in 1991 by Temple University Press, Cross debunks two major myths: (1) that self-hatred was the dominant premise in Black identity, and (2) that it is possible to describe the Black identity as if it is a singular and predictable descriptor. He included an exhaustive review and analysis of the literature that had been previously published on Negro identity between 1936 and 1967. In this review, Cross detailed two errors committed almost invariably by the authors during this time frame – they generalized conclusions about adult identity from the results of research conducted with preschool-aged children, and they employed measures that assessed social attitudes while interpreting their results as if they had assessed factors of personality like self-esteem or self-hatred. Shades of Black highlighted crucial themes involving mental health and adaptive fortitude systematically disregarded by researchers who were all too often caught up in substantiating Black pathology. As such, this book was instrumental in shifting the focus of psychology away from Black pathology models towards a more “normative and positive” black psychology through logical, rational, and empirically substantiated arguments.

This book also explores the Black Power Movement and the identity transformations that accompanied this social movement. Cross demonstrated how working and middle-class Black families had historically exhibited strong mental health and adaptive personal qualities that allowed them to prevail and maintain positive self-images even in the midst of their political and social struggles. He further exhibited a wide variability of perspectives, ideologies, and self-concepts allowing for an infinite number of pathways to happiness, evidencing the impracticability of forging a singular definition of what it means to be Black or to “live the good Black life.” He even suggested that for some Black individuals, their racial/cultural identity is unimportant to their daily existence, despite the significant role it plays in many lives. The latter part of Shades of Black revises Cross's original Negro-to-Black Conversion Model described in his 1971 publication, as he came across multiple weaknesses of the model in forging the perspective detailed in this book. "Relying too much on theory or research can result in an incomplete picture of a phenomenon if theory and research are not used reciprocally to peel away layers."

== Validating the Cross Racial Identity Scale (2002) ==
Cross, Vandiver, Worrell, and Fhagen-Smith confirmed the validity of the Cross Racial Identity Scale (CRIS, which was first detailed in a 2000 publication), via two studies using African American college students. In the first study, the researchers performed a preliminary analysis of the structural validity of the CRIS using exploratory factor analysis. The second study examined the 6 CRIS subscales and the Nigrescence model. Results of these studies demonstrated high reliability of the CRIS in addition to high structural validity. There was a high correlation between the IMCI and PA (subscale intercorrelations), which may indicate that it in such a racially charged environment like the United States, isolating a Black RGO from African Americans may be impractical. The CRIS subscale scores appear to be correlated with self-esteem, rather than social desirability or personality traits.

== Nigrescence and ego identity development: Accounting for differential Black identity patterns (1996) ==
This study expanded Cross's Black identity development model to a lifespan perspective. In essence, the study examined the Nigrescence model in cohort with Erik Erikson's (1968) adolescent development model and determined that a distinction was necessary between the two because there was some overlap in the populations that the models described. Cross and Fhagen-Smith determined that the importance factor in this distinction was the centrality of the individual; individuals who made their race/ethnicity central to their identity or sense of self may be better described by the Nigrescence model, whereas those with “nonethnic” frameworks may be better described by Erikson's adolescent development model. The work established in this paper emphasized the relationship between Nigrescence and self-concept or identity development and related that Nigrescence may begin for an individual as early as adolescence, or after the development of one's foundational adult identity.

== Awards and recognition ==
William E. Cross Jr. received the 2009 Annual Social Justice Action Award, awarded by the Teachers College, Columbia University. Georgia Southern University established the Dr. William Cross Jr. Distinguished Lecture Series as part of GSU-linked annual conference on Cross-Cultural Issues in Counseling and Education.

He was the 2014 President of American Psychological Association's Division 45 (Society for the Psychological Study of Ethnic Minority Issues). He is also a CUNY Professor Emeritus, and a Morgridge College of Education Change Agent.

== Bibliography ==
- The Negro to Black Conversion Experience (1971)
- The Thomas and Cross Models of Psychological Nigrescence: A Review (1978)
- The Negro-to-Black conversion experience: An empirical analysis (1979)
- Shades of Black : diversity in African-American identity (1991)
- The stages of Black identity development: Nigrescence models (1991)
- The psychology of Nigrescence: Revising the Cross model (1995)
- Nigrescence and ego identity development: Accounting for differential Black identity patterns (1996)
- The everyday functions of African American identity (1998)
- African American identity development across the lifespan: Educational implications (1999)
- Encountering nigrescence (2001)
- Tracing the Historical Origins of Youth Delinquency & Violence: Myths and Realities about Black Culture (2003)
