= Kenji Yoshino =

American legal scholar (born 1969)

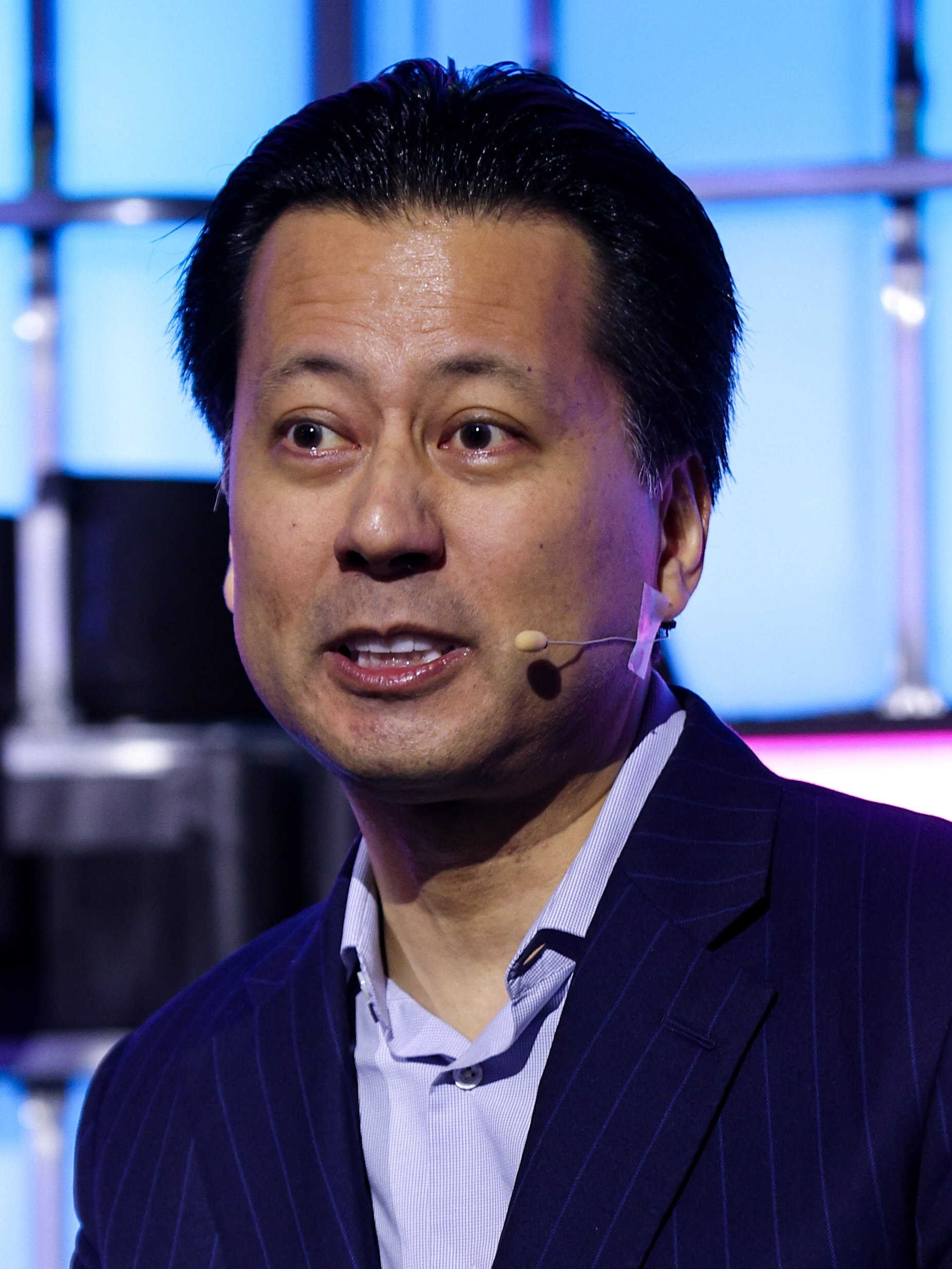
- Yoshino in 2025
- Born: May 1, 1969 (age 57)
- Education: Harvard University (BA); Magdalen College, Oxford (MSc); Yale University (JD)
- Occupation: Law professor

Kenji Yoshino (born May 1, 1969) is an American legal scholar and the Chief Justice Earl Warren Professor of Constitutional Law at the New York University School of Law. Formerly, he was the Guido Calabresi Professor of Law at Yale Law School. His work involves constitutional law, anti-discrimination law, civil and human rights, as well as law and literature, and Japanese law and society.

== Education ==
Yoshino graduated from Phillips Exeter Academy (1987) as valedictorian and Harvard College, obtaining a B.A. in English literature summa cum laude in 1991. Between undergraduate years, Yoshino worked as an aide for various members of the Japanese Parliament. He moved on to Magdalen College, Oxford, as a Rhodes Scholar, earning a M.Sc. in management studies (industrial relations) in 1993. In 1996, he earned a J.D. from Yale Law School, where he was an editor of the Yale Law Journal.

== Career ==
From 1996 to 1997, Yoshino served as a law clerk for Judge Guido Calabresi of the U.S. Court of Appeals for the Second Circuit. In 1998, he received a tenure-track position at Yale Law School as an associate professor, and in 2003 the school bestowed a full professorship. In 2006, he was named the inaugural Guido Calabresi Professor of Law.

His first book Covering: The Hidden Assault on Our Civil Rights was published in 2006. It is a mix of argument intertwined with pertinent biographical narratives. His second book, A Thousand Times More Fair: What Shakespeare's Plays Teach Us About Justice was published in 2011. In 2016, his book Speak Now: Marriage Equality on Trial was published and received the Stonewall Book Award's Israel Fishman Non-Fiction Award.

Covering won the Randy Shilts Award for Gay Non-Fiction from Publishing Triangle in 2007. His major areas of interest include social dynamics, conformity and assimilation, as well as queer (LGBT) and personal liberty issues. He has been a co-plaintiff in cases related to his specialties.

During the 2006-2007 and 2007-2008 school years, he served as a visiting professor at New York University School of Law, and in February 2008 he accepted a full-time tenured position as the Chief Justice Earl Warren Professor of Constitutional Law.

In May 2011, Yoshino was elected to the Harvard Board of Overseers, where he served a six-year term. In 2023, Kenji Yoshino joined the Facebook Oversight Board. In July 2023, following a recommendation from the oversight board to deplatform Cambodian head of state Hun Sen, the government of Cambodia listed Yoshino as one of 22 people connected with Meta who were banned from entering the country.

== Personal life ==
A Japanese American, and openly gay man, Yoshino writes poetry for personal enjoyment.

== Major works ==
- (1996). "Suspect Symbols: The Literary Argument for Heightened Scrutiny for Gays". Columbia Law Review, 96 (1753).
- (1997). "The Lawyer of Belmont". Yale Journal of Law & the Humanities. 9 (183).
- (1998). "Assimilationist Bias in Equal Protection: The Visibility Presumption and the Case of 'Don’t Ask, Don’t Tell'". Yale Law Journal 108 (487).
- (2000). "The Epistemic Contract of Bisexual Erasure". Stanford Law Review, 52 (2).
- (2000). "The Eclectic Model of Censorship". California Law Review, 88 (5).
- (2002). "Covering". Yale Law Journal, 111 (769).
- (2005). "The City and the Poet" Yale Law Journal, 114 (1835).
- (2006). Covering: The Hidden Assault on Our Civil Rights. Random House. ISBN 0-375-50820-1.
- (2011). "The New Equal Protection" Harvard Law Review, 124 (747).
- (2011). A Thousand Times More Fair: What Shakespeare's Plays Teach Us About Justice. HarperCollins. ISBN 978-0-06-176910-8.
- (2016). Speak Now: Marriage Equality on Trial. Broadway Books. ISBN 978-0385348829.
- (2023). Say the Right Thing: How to Talk About Diversity, Identity, and Justice. (with David Glasgow). Atria Books. ISBN 978-1982181383.

== See also ==
- Joe Biden Supreme Court candidates
