= Rena R. Wing =

American obesity researcher

Rena R. Wing is recognized for her well-established research on behavioral treatments of obesity. Dr. Wing's research examined positive outcomes for long-term weight loss as well as halting weight gain in individuals who are currently overweight. This led to an important development in Wing's research which was the layout of a lifestyle intervention for those with diabetes, particularly type 2.

Wing graduated with a Ph.D. in Social Relations and later completed her postdoctoral fellowship by 1973. Dr. Wing was a professor at University of Pittsburgh for 25 years. During her time in Pittsburgh, she took part in various organizations working on different treatments for diabetes.

Currently, Wing is a professor at Brown University as well as the director of research focused on studying weight control. Not only has she dedicated her time to serving on different councils and panels, she has published over 250 peer-reviewed articles. She achieved this while simultaneously mentoring many junior faculty members on her topic of focus. All of these accomplishments have resulted in Wing receiving many awards. For example, in 2024, Brown University awarded Wing the Rosenberger Medal of Honor.

== Research completed and in progress ==
Rena Wing has been actively researching behavioral treatments of obesity for about forty years. She has examined many aspects of weight loss. Wing has completed research on four different questions examining the health benefits of modest weight loss, how behavioral treatment of obesity can be improved, whether it is possible to prevent weight gain and subsequent obesity, and the characteristics of successful weight loss maintainers. Wing is currently studying successful weight losers comparing those with normal weight controls versus obese weight controls. Right now, she is also the director of the Weight Control and Diabetes Research Center, which has over 50 researchers and staff members.

=== Health benefits of modest weight loss ===
While examining the various health benefits of weight loss, Wing developed an intervention which was ultimately used in the Diabetes Prevention Program (DPP). DPP was a trial which tested the effective differences between lifestyle interventions or metformin, a diabetes medication, and whether these differences were significantly variant on their ability to delay the onset of type 2 diabetes. During her research on the health benefits of modest weight loss, Wing recruited more than 3,000 overweight patients who suffered from impaired glucose tolerance. These patients were randomly assigned either a placebo, metformin, or a lifestyle intervention. The results of this study found that reduced risks of developing diabetes from an average weight loss of 14 pounds (considered to be modest weight loss) was 58% with the placebo in comparison to 31% with the patients who received the metformin. Wing has continued to investigate this, but has changed her focus towards cardiovascular morbidity or mortality. She is currently testing over 5,000 overweight individuals who have type 2 diabetes. This study not only focuses on the effects of weight loss in terms of cardiovascular morbidity, but also has an interest in the impact this weight loss has for the long-term (12 years).

=== Improving behavioral treatment of obesity ===
Wing has also looked into how behavioral treatment of obesity can be improved. She has compared the different strategies included in behavioral programs. One example of this would be that high exercise goals and structured approaches to diet increase the chances of improving weight loss outcomes. Wing's studies analyzed the role of involving overweight spouses, using financial incentives, encouraging taking breaks from dieting, and creating intra-group and inter-group competitions. Currently Wing is gathering more information on the effects of reducing variety in the diet and examining the effect of modifying the home environment. Wing has decided to expand her studies on this particular topic by looking at how the internet has an effect on behavioral techniques. She is focusing on various approaches of e-mail counseling or automated counseling.

=== Preventing weight gain and obesity ===
Wing is curious as to whether it is statistically possible to prevent weight gain and subsequent obesity. It has been found that there are three critical points in a person's life which have the most effective weight loss. These are childhood, the time surrounding pregnancy, and the menopausal transition.

Leonard Epstein worked alongside Wing to assist in complete multiple trials on the behavior treatments of obese children around the ages of 8–12 years old and their overweight parent(s). Research has started to shift in this area towards focusing on children as young as 4–8 years old, and adolescents. Wing concluded that the lifestyle intervention successfully reduced weight gain and the increase in LDL-cholesterol that are usually found in middle-aged women.

=== Characteristics for maintaining weight loss ===
Wing recognized that maintenance of weight loss is an important issue when it comes to the treatment of obesity. She is the founder of the National Weight Control Registry, which has a registry of over 5,000 people who have lost over at least 30 pounds, with an average loss of 70 pounds, and kept that weight off for at least one year, with an average of 5.7 years. Information has been collected on the various behaviors that are correlated with long-term maintenance of weight loss through self-reported data. Wing has proven that it is possible to teach the strategies of successful weight losers, resulting in improving others' ability to maintain their own personal weight loss.

In an effort to continue and help others, Wing assisted in a project called STOP Regain, where she found that a self-regulation intervention through the internet or face-to-face had the ability to reduce the risk of weight regain. Knowing this, Wing created a study which compares successful weight losers with normal weight controls and obese controls in terms of behavioral measures and brain responses to food cues. Wing focused on whether successful weight losers who have reduced to normal weight now respond to food cues as always-normal weight controls, or if they continue to respond as if obese.

== Career ==
Dr. Rena Wing received her bachelor's degree in psychology from Connecticut College in 1967. In 1968, she earned her master's degree and doctorate degree in Social Psychology, graduating in 1971. She completed a postdoctoral fellowship at the National Institute of Mental Health as well as at Harvard Medical School in the department of Psychiatry by 1973. Dr. Wing then spent the next 25 years as a teacher at the University of Pittsburgh. She lectured in psychiatry, psychology, and epidemiology. In between her work in Pittsburgh, Wing also spent a few years as a lecturer in psychology at Stanford University in California. During her years in Pittsburgh, she became the director of the National Institute of Diabetes and Digestive and Kidney Diseases (NIDDK) in 1999. After she concluded her time in Pittsburgh, she continued her teaching at Brown University in Providence, Rhode Island. Dr. Wing is currently a professor at Brown University, and also dedicates her time to many other research panels and councils.
