= Prudence Carter =

American sociologist

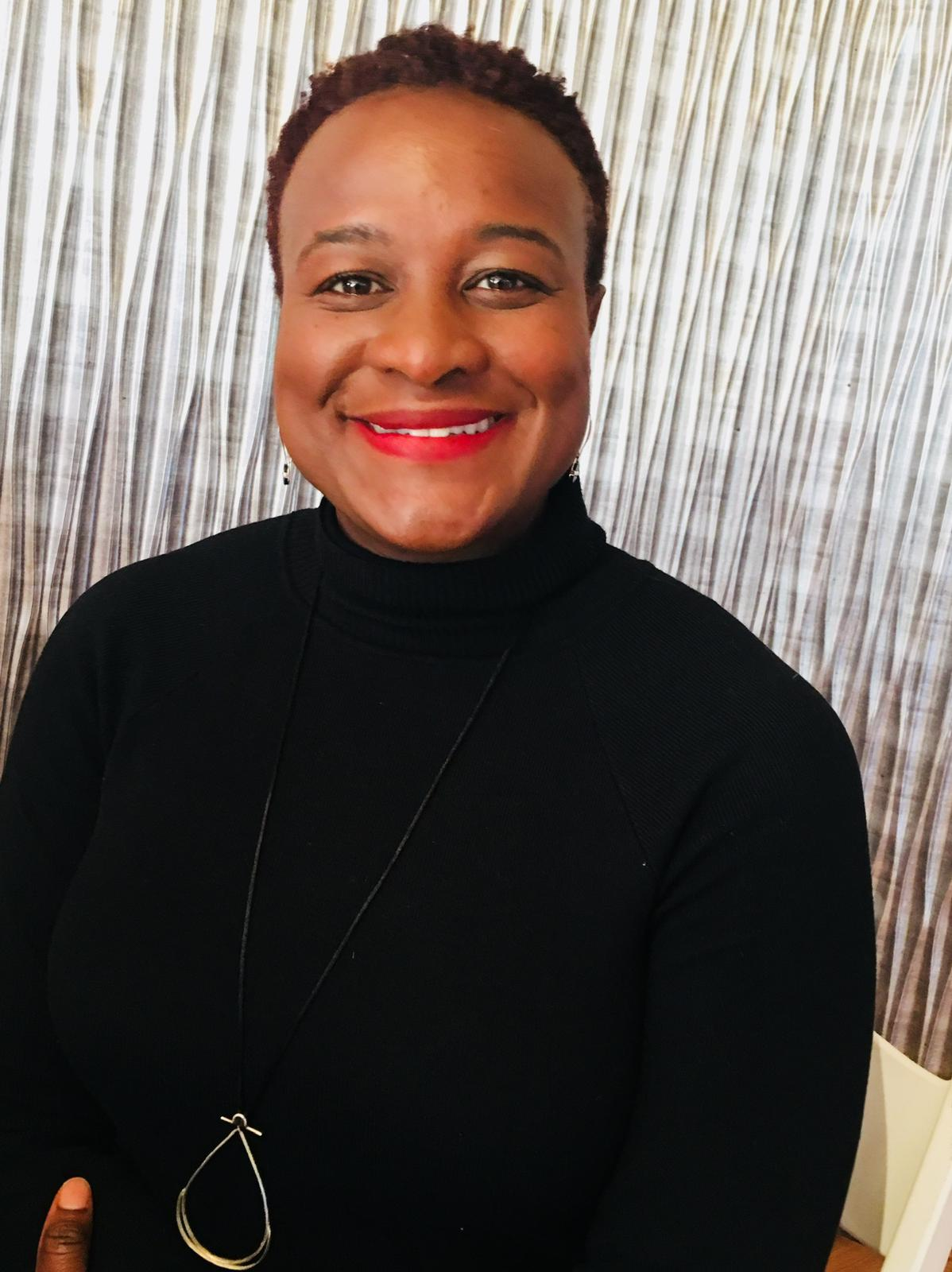
- Born: Mississippi, USA
- Occupations: Sarah and Joseph, Jr. Dowling Professor; 114th President of the American Sociological Association
- Title: Member of National Academy of Education; Fellow of the American Educational Research Association
- Awards: The Berkeley Citation

Academic background
- Education: Brown University (Sc.B.); Teachers College, Columbia University (M.A.); Columbia University (M.Phil.); Columbia University (Ph.D.)

Academic work
- Discipline: Education and Sociology
- Institutions: Brown University

Prudence Carter is an American sociologist. She is a Sarah and Joseph Jr. Dowling Professor of Sociology at Brown University. She was the 114th president of the American Sociological Association from 2023 to 2024.

Carter previously served as dean of the Graduate School of Education at University of California, Berkeley, where she was awarded The Berkeley Citation in 2021. She is a fellow of the American Educational Research Association, an elected member of the National Academy of Education, and is currently Sarah and Joseph Jr. Dowling Professor of Sociology at Brown University.

== Education ==
Carter has a bachelor's degree in economics and applied mathematics from Brown University, an MA in education and sociology from Teachers College, Columbia University, and an MPhil and PhD in sociology from Columbia University.

== Career ==
Carter was an assistant professor in the department of sociology at Harvard University. She served on the faculty at Stanford University from 2007 to 2016. Carter also served as the Faculty Director of John W. Gardner Center for Youth and Their Communities, and the Director of the Research Institute for Comparative Studies in Race and Ethnicity. From 2016 to 2021, she was Dean of the Graduate School of Education and E.H. and Mary E. Pardee Professor at the University of California at Berkeley. Before stepping down as the UC Berkeley GSE dean on July 31, 2021, she was awarded The Berkeley Citation.

== Books ==
- Keepin’ It Real: School Success beyond Black and White (2005) Oxford University Press ISBN 978-0-19532-523-2
- Stubborn Roots: Race, Culture, and Inequality in U.S. & South African Schools (2012) Oxford University Press ISBN 978-0-19989-965-4
- Co-editor with Kevin G. Welner of Closing the Opportunity Gap: What America Must Do to Give Every Child an Even Chance (2013) Oxford University Press ISBN 978-0-19998-299-8
