= Nigrescence =

Development of a black racial identity

Nigrescence is a word with a Latin origin. It describes a process of becoming Black or developing a racial identity.

Nigrescence extends through history and impacts those victimized by racism and white supremacy. Recent psychological adaptations instigated identity formation for persons of African American descent. The process of enslavement typically included deliberate and forceful repression of traditional languages and mental development to stifle the desire for freedom and to make freedom feel unattainable and unrealistic.

Slave owners knew that physical restraints were never as effective as broken spirits. Hundreds of years later, the descendants of African diaspora struggle to process any form of trauma, which typically results in delayed progress in emotional development.

== History ==
Professor William E. Cross Jr. included a theory of Nigrescence in his groundbreaking book Shades of Black: Diversity in African American Identity, which was published in 1991. His theory assumed that African Americans are "believed to be socialized into the predominant culture, which resulted in diminished racial identification", and thus the Nigrescence model posits that an encounter with an instance of racism or racial discrimination may precipitate the exploration and formation of racial identity, and foster a deeper understanding of the role race plays in the lives of African Americans.

African Americans then proceed through a series of distinct psychological stages as they move from self-degradation to self-pride over time. This model is depicted in the 6th episode of the 2023 TV series Unprisoned.

Charles Thomas came up with the concept of negromachy. He believed there was a confusion of self-worth where the person shows inappropriate dependence on white society for self definition. He created a five-stage nigrescence model.

Bailey Jackson created a four-stage nigrescense model.

Frantz Fanon coined the term, "to become black", which meant as a process of developing a black identity under conditions of oppression.

== Theorists ==
- Frantz Fanon
- William E. Cross Jr.
- Bailey Jackson
- Charles Thomas

== Stages ==
Theorist:	William E. Cross Jr.	Bailey Jackson	Charles Thomas
Stages:	Pre-encounter Encounter: Realization; Decision; Immersion/emersion Internalization	Passive acceptance Active resistance Redirection Internalization	Withdrawal Testifying Information processing Activity Transcendental

=== Pre-encounter ===
The pre-encounter stage is characterized by an idealization of the dominant traditional white world view and the denigration of a black world view. There are two forms of pre-encounter, active or passive. People in the active pre-encounter stage deliberately idealize whiteness and white culture and form anti-black attitudes and behaviors. In the active variant of the pre-encounter stage, the separation of personality identity from the group identity is evidenced.

On the other hand, people experiencing passive or assimilating pre-encounter, tend to believe that personal effort will guarantee “passage” into white culture, i.e., the realization of the American dream. Such people are highly motivated to be accepted by the dominant group, and at the same time they also accept the negative stereotypes of blacks and the positive stereotypes of whites since their views are influenced and reinforced by the dominant culture and institutions.

=== Encounter ===
The encounter stage is characterized by a conscious awareness that the white world view is no longer viable, and that one must find a new identity. This awareness is usually aroused by an event(s) in the environment that profoundly touches a black person's inner thinking, spurring them to re-evaluate the relationship between blacks and whites. And the event(s) makes it impossible for the person to deny the existence of such a contradictory relationship.

The struggle that follows the confrontation is composed of a mixture of feelings such as confusion, hopelessness, anxiety, depression, and anger. The person has to search their own self-identity in relation with racial identity, and their ascribed racial status in the society.

=== Immersion ===
During the immersion stage, the person psychologically and physically withdraws into blackness and a black world; black racial identity dominates individual self identity. But the person may not know what it really means to be black so the person may use the stereotypes of what they learned from the white culture to define black people and act accordingly, for example, wearing "black" clothes, listening to "black" music, and attempting to speak in "black" slang.

The person may be angry at themselves for not realizing the differences earlier, and also angry at other blacks for not opening their eyes to "see" things clearly. In this stage, the world view is either-or, a dichotomous thinking about black and white. This most likely happens to black adolescents who can't find meaningful purposes for themselves and who they really are in the existing education system; they may show strong hostility and anger toward others.

=== Emersion ===
According to Cross, the emersion state is an acceptance of the multitude of ways to be and enact Blackness post-immersion. The fervor of full immersion levels off. At this stage, a person might begin to re-develop relationships with family members and friends who were cast off as under-serving Blackness during the immersion stage. Also during this stage, a person might be better able to control their behavior and intense emotions when participating in dominant society.

=== Internalization ===
During this stage, the dissonance between the old self and the new emerging self are resolved. At this stage a person might adapt a more nuanced definition of Blackness and reject simplistic either-or definitions. A person's values and cultural style are rooted in informed African heritage and history. The person is connected spiritually and psychologically to an African-descended community.

== See also ==
- Négritude

== Bibliography ==
- Cross, William E. Jr. "Nigrescence Theory: Historical and Explanatory Notes." Journal of Vocational Behavior, April 23, 1994.
