= Materice =

Christmas tradition among Croats and Serbs

Materice (also known as Majčice and Majke nebeske) is a tradition at the third Sunday of Advent. It is found among Croatian Catholics in Dalmatia, among the Croats of Bosnia and Herzegovina and Bačka. The custom is part of a whole with the Djetinjci of the second Sunday and the Očići of the fourth Sunday of Advent. A similar custom (Serbian Cyrillic: Материце) exists among Serbian Orthodoxs on "Sunday of the Forefathers", the penultimate Sunday before Christmas according to the Julian calendar.

Customs vary from region to region, but they all have one thing in common: a joke on the mother's account. The children "threaten" their mothers, who appease them with gifts. According to custom, mothers give their children candy, nuts, fruit, hazelnuts, and other gifts, while children express their gratitude by congratulating them Materice. The mother is not expected to give money, but rather an edible gift.

It has been recorded that in the Sinjska krajina children prepare a rope in the morning and "threaten" their mother with hanging her if she does not make amends. On that day, the groom comes to his mother and asks for a ransom, in the form of a walnut or a cigarette, then goes to the sílo (communal meeting), brings his bride rakija, while she gifts him with a shirt, socks, etc.

Although, as a rule, only children congratulate their mothers, the custom has also become established in which husbands congratulate their wives, including mothers-in-law and other married women in their locality.

== Literature ==
- Dragić, Marko (2008). "Advent u liturgiji i narodnoj kulturi Hrvata" [Advent in liturgy and national culture of the Croats]. Crkva U Svijetu (in Croatian). 43 (3). Split: Catholic Faculty of Theology, University of Split: 414–440.
