= Psychology =

Study of mental functions and behaviors

Psychology is the scientific study of the mind and behavior. Its subject matter includes the behavior of humans and nonhumans, both conscious and unconscious phenomena, and mental processes such as thoughts, feelings, and motives. Psychology is an academic discipline of broad scope, crossing the boundaries between the natural and social sciences.

A professional practitioner or researcher involved in the discipline is called a psychologist. Some psychologists can also be classified as behavioral or cognitive scientists. Some psychologists attempt to understand the role of mental functions in individual and social behavior. Others explore the physiological and neurobiological processes that underlie cognitive functions and behaviors. Biological psychologists seek an understanding of the emergent properties of brains, linking the discipline to neuroscience. As social scientists, psychologists aim to understand the behavior of individuals and groups.

As part of an interdisciplinary field, psychologists are involved in research on perception, cognition, attention, emotion, intelligence, subjective experiences, motivation, brain functioning, and personality. Psychologists' interests extend to interpersonal relationships, psychological resilience, family resilience, and other areas within social psychology. They also consider the unconscious mind. Research psychologists employ empirical methods to infer causal and correlational relationships between psychosocial variables. Some, but not all, clinical and counseling psychologists rely on symbolic interpretation.

While psychological knowledge is often applied to the assessment and treatment of mental health problems, it is also directed towards understanding and solving problems in several spheres of human activity. By many accounts, psychology ultimately aims to benefit society. Many psychologists are involved in some therapeutic role, practicing psychotherapy in clinical, counseling, or school settings. Other psychologists conduct scientific research on a wide range of topics related to mental processes and behavior. Typically, the latter group of psychologists works in academic settings (e.g., universities, medical schools, or hospitals). Another group of psychologists is employed in industrial and organizational settings. Yet others are involved in work on human development, aging, sports, health, forensic science, education, and the media.

== Etymology and definitions ==
The word psychology derives from the Greek word psyche, for spirit or soul. The latter part of the word psychology derives from -λογία -logia, which means "study" or "research". The word psychology was first used in the Renaissance. In its Latin form psychiologia, it was first employed by the Croatian humanist and Latinist Marko Marulić in his book Psichiologia de ratione animae humanae (Psychology, on the Nature of the Human Soul) in the decade 1510–1520. The earliest known reference to the word psychology in English was by Steven Blankaart in 1694 in The Physical Dictionary. The dictionary refers to "Anatomy, which treats the Body, and Psychology, which treats of the Soul."

Ψ (psi), the first letter of the Greek word psyche from which the term psychology is derived, is commonly associated with the field of psychology.

In 1890, William James defined psychology as "the science of mental life, both of its phenomena and their conditions." This definition enjoyed widespread currency for decades. However, this meaning was contested, notably by John B. Watson, who in 1913 asserted the methodological behaviorist view of psychology as a purely objective experimental branch of natural science, the theoretical goal of which "is the prediction and control of behavior." Since James defined "psychology", the term more strongly implicates scientific experimentation. Folk psychology is the understanding of the mental states and behaviors of people held by ordinary people, as contrasted with psychology professionals' understanding.

== History ==
The ancient civilizations of Egypt, Greece, China, India, and Persia all engaged in the philosophical study of psychology. In ancient Egypt the Ebers Papyrus mentioned depression and thought disorders. Historians note that Greek philosophers, including Thales, Plato, and Aristotle (especially in his De Anima treatise), addressed the workings of the mind. As early as the 4th century BCE, the Greek physician Hippocrates theorized that mental disorders had physical rather than supernatural causes. In 387 BCE, Plato suggested that the brain is where mental processes take place, and in 335 BC, Aristotle suggested that it was the heart.

In China, the foundations of psychological thought emerged from the philosophical works of ancient thinkers like Laozi and Confucius, as well as the teachings of Buddhism. This body of knowledge drew insights from introspection, observation, and techniques for focused thinking and behavior. It viewed the universe as comprising physical and mental realms and their interplay. Chinese philosophy also emphasized purifying the mind to increase virtue and power. An ancient text known as The Yellow Emperor's Classic of Internal Medicine identifies the brain as the nexus of wisdom and sensation, includes theories of personality based on yin–yang balance, and analyzes mental disorder in terms of physiological and social disequilibria. Chinese scholarship that focused on the brain advanced during the Qing dynasty with the work of Western-educated Fang Yizhi (1611–1671), Liu Zhi (1660–1730), and Wang Qingren (1768–1831). Wang Qingren emphasized the brain as the center of the nervous system, linked mental disorders to brain diseases, investigated the causes of dreams and insomnia, and advanced a theory of hemispheric lateralization in brain function.

Influenced by Hinduism, Indian philosophy explored distinctions in types of awareness. A central idea of the Upanishads and other Vedic texts that formed the foundations of Hinduism was the distinction between a person's transient mundane self and their eternal, unchanging soul. Divergent Hindu doctrines and Buddhism have challenged this hierarchy of selves, but have all emphasized the importance of reaching higher awareness. Yoga encompasses a range of techniques for pursuing the goal of higher awareness. Theosophy, a religion established by Russian-American philosopher Helena Blavatsky, drew inspiration from these doctrines during her time in British India.

Psychology was of interest to Enlightenment thinkers in Europe. In Germany, Gottfried Wilhelm Leibniz (1646–1716) applied his principles of calculus to the mind, arguing that mental activity took place on an indivisible continuum. He suggested that the difference between conscious and unconscious awareness is only a matter of degree. Christian Wolff identified psychology as its own science, writing Psychologia Empirica in 1732 and Psychologia Rationalis in 1734. Immanuel Kant advanced the idea of anthropology as a discipline, with psychology an important subdivision. Kant, however, explicitly rejected the idea of an experimental psychology, writing that "the empirical doctrine of the soul can also never approach chemistry even as a systematic art of analysis or experimental doctrine, for in it the manifold of inner observation can be separated only by mere division in thought, and cannot then be held separate and recombined at will (but still less does another thinking subject suffer himself to be experimented upon to suit our purpose), and even observation by itself already changes and displaces the state of the observed object."

In 1783, Ferdinand Ueberwasser (1752–1812) designated himself Professor of Empirical Psychology and Logic and gave lectures on scientific psychology, though these developments were soon overshadowed by the Napoleonic Wars. At the end of the Napoleonic era, Prussian authorities discontinued the Old University of Münster. Having consulted philosophers Hegel and Herbart, however, in 1825 the Prussian state established psychology as a mandatory discipline in its rapidly expanding and highly influential educational system. However, this discipline did not yet embrace experimentation. In England, early psychology involved phrenology and the response to social problems, including alcoholism, violence, and the country's crowded "lunatic" asylums.

=== Beginning of experimental psychology ===
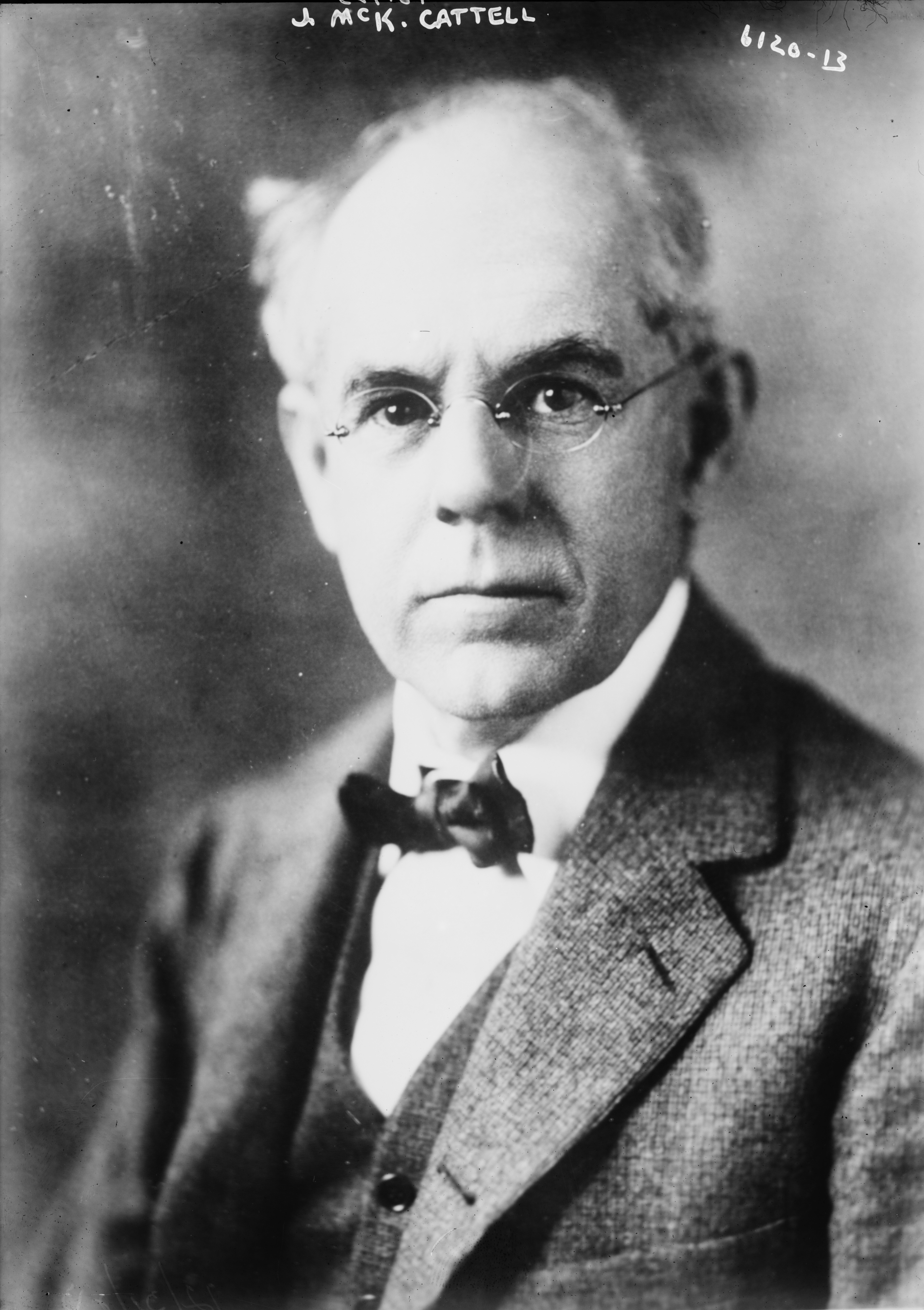
James McKeen Cattell, the first psychologist in the United States

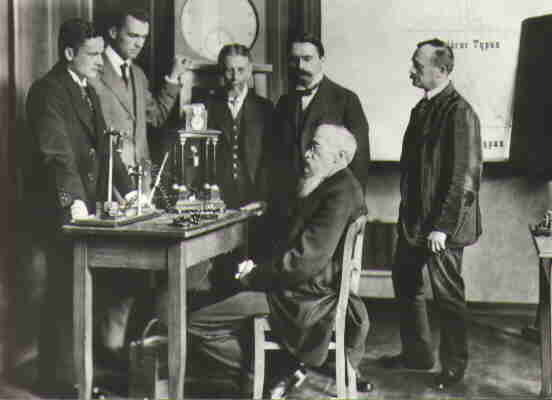
Wilhelm Wundt (seated), a German psychologist, with colleagues in his psychological laboratory, the first of its kind, c. 1880

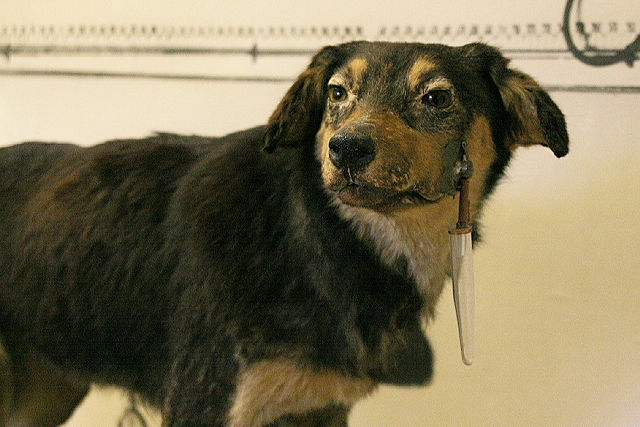
One of the dogs used in Russian psychologist Ivan Pavlov's experiment with a surgically implanted cannula to measure saliva, preserved in the Pavlov Museum in Ryazan, Russia

Philosopher John Stuart Mill believed that the human mind was open to scientific investigation, even if the science is in some ways inexact. Mill proposed a "mental chemistry" in which elementary thoughts could combine into ideas of greater complexity. Gustav Fechner began conducting psychophysics research in Leipzig in the 1830s. He articulated the principle that human perception of a stimulus varies logarithmically according to its intensity. The principle became known as the Weber–Fechner law. Fechner's 1860 Elements of Psychophysics challenged Kant's negative view of the idea of conducting quantitative research on the mind. Fechner's achievement was to show that "mental processes could not only be given numerical magnitudes, but also that these could be measured by experimental methods." In Heidelberg, Hermann von Helmholtz conducted parallel research on sensory perception, and trained physiologist Wilhelm Wundt. Wundt, in turn, came to Leipzig University, where he established the psychological laboratory that brought experimental psychology to the world. Wundt focused on breaking down mental processes into the most basic components, motivated in part by an analogy to recent advances in chemistry, and its successful investigation of the elements and structure of materials. Paul Flechsig and Emil Kraepelin soon created another influential laboratory at Leipzig, a psychology-related lab, that focused more on experimental psychiatry.

James McKeen Cattell, a professor of psychology at the University of Pennsylvania and Columbia University and the co-founder of Psychological Review, was the first professor of psychology in the United States.

The German psychologist Hermann Ebbinghaus, a researcher at the University of Berlin, was a 19th-century contributor to the field. He pioneered the experimental study of memory and developed quantitative models of learning and forgetting. In the early 20th century, Wolfgang Kohler, Max Wertheimer, and Kurt Koffka co-founded the school of Gestalt psychology of Fritz Perls. The approach of Gestalt psychology is based upon the idea that individuals experience things as unified wholes. Rather than reducing thoughts and behavior into smaller component elements, as in structuralism, the Gestaltists maintain that the whole of experience is important, "and is something else than the sum of its parts, because summing is a meaningless procedure, whereas the whole-part relationship is meaningful."

Psychologists in Germany, Denmark, Austria, England, and the United States soon followed Wundt in setting up laboratories. G. Stanley Hall, an American who studied with Wundt, founded a psychology lab that became internationally influential. The lab was located at Johns Hopkins University. Hall, in turn, trained Yujiro Motora, who brought experimental psychology, with an emphasis on psychophysics, to the Imperial University of Tokyo. Wundt's assistant, Hugo Münsterberg, taught psychology at Harvard to students such as Narendra Nath Sen Gupta—who, in 1905, founded a psychology department and laboratory at the University of Calcutta. Wundt's students Walter Dill Scott, Lightner Witmer, and James McKeen Cattell worked on developing tests of mental ability. Cattell, who also studied with eugenicist Francis Galton, went on to found the Psychological Corporation. Witmer focused on the mental testing of children; Scott, on employee selection.

Another student of Wundt, the Englishman Edward Titchener, created the psychology program at Cornell University and advanced "structuralist" psychology. The idea behind structuralism was to analyze and classify different aspects of the mind, primarily through the method of introspection. William James, John Dewey, and Harvey Carr advanced the idea of functionalism, an expansive approach to psychology that underlined the Darwinian idea of a behavior's usefulness to the individual. In 1890, James wrote an influential book, The Principles of Psychology, which expanded on structuralism. He memorably described "stream of consciousness". James's ideas interested many American students in the emerging discipline. Dewey integrated psychology with societal concerns, most notably by promoting progressive education, inculcating moral values in children, and assimilating immigrants.

A different strain of experimentalism, with a greater connection to physiology, emerged in South America, under the leadership of Horacio G. Piñero at the University of Buenos Aires. In Russia, too, researchers placed greater emphasis on the biological basis for psychology, beginning with Ivan Sechenov's 1873 essay, "Who Is to Develop Psychology and How?" Sechenov advanced the idea of brain reflexes and aggressively promoted a deterministic view of human behavior. The Russian-Soviet physiologist Ivan Pavlov discovered in dogs a learning process that was later termed "classical conditioning" and applied the process to human beings.

=== Consolidation and funding ===
One of the earliest psychology societies was La Société de Psychologie Physiologique in France, which lasted from 1885 to 1893. The first meeting of the International Congress of Psychology, sponsored by the International Union of Psychological Science, took place in Paris in August 1889, amid the World's Fair celebrating the centennial of the French Revolution. William James was one of three Americans among the 400 attendees. The American Psychological Association (APA) was founded soon after, in 1892. The International Congress continued to be held at different locations in Europe, and with wide international participation. The Sixth Congress, held in Geneva in 1909, included presentations in Russian, Chinese, and Japanese, as well as Esperanto. After a hiatus due to World War I, the Seventh Congress met in Oxford, with substantially greater participation by the war-victorious Anglo-Americans. In 1929, the Congress took place at Yale University in New Haven, Connecticut, attended by hundreds of members of the APA. Tokyo Imperial University led the way in bringing new psychology to the East. New ideas about psychology diffused from Japan into China.

American psychology gained status upon the U.S.'s entry into World War I. A standing committee headed by Robert Yerkes administered mental tests ("Army Alpha" and "Army Beta") to almost 1.8 million soldiers. Subsequently, the Rockefeller family, via the Social Science Research Council, began to provide funding for behavioral research. Rockefeller charities funded the National Committee on Mental Hygiene, which disseminated the concept of mental illness and lobbied for applying ideas from psychology to child rearing. Through the Bureau of Social Hygiene and later funding of Alfred Kinsey, Rockefeller foundations helped establish research on sexuality in the U.S. Under the influence of the Carnegie-funded Eugenics Record Office, the Draper-funded Pioneer Fund, and other institutions, the eugenics movement also influenced American psychology. In the 1910s and 1920s, eugenics became a standard topic in psychology classes. In contrast to the US, in the UK, psychology was met with antagonism by the scientific and medical establishments, and up until 1939, there were only six psychology chairs in universities in England.

During World War II and the Cold War, the U.S. military and intelligence agencies, including the newly created Office of Strategic Services and forerunner to the CIA, became leading funders of psychology. University of Michigan psychologist Dorwin Cartwright reported that university researchers began large-scale propaganda research in 1939–1941. He observed that "the last few months of the war saw a social psychologist become chiefly responsible for determining the week-by-week propaganda policy for the United States Government." Cartwright also wrote that psychologists had significant roles in managing the domestic economy. The Army rolled out its new General Classification Test to assess the ability of millions of soldiers. The Army also engaged in large-scale psychological research of troop morale and mental health. In the 1950s, the Rockefeller Foundation and Ford Foundation collaborated with the Central Intelligence Agency (CIA) to fund research on psychological warfare. In 1965, public controversy called attention to the Army's Project Camelot, the "Manhattan Project" of social science, an effort which enlisted psychologists and anthropologists to analyze the plans and policies of foreign countries for strategic purposes.

In Germany after World War I, psychology held institutional power through the military, which was subsequently expanded along with the rest of the military during Nazi Germany. Under the direction of Hermann Göring's cousin Matthias Göring, the Berlin Psychoanalytic Institute was renamed the Göring Institute. Freudian psychoanalysts were expelled and persecuted under the anti-Jewish policies of the Nazi Party, and all psychologists had to distance themselves from Freud and Adler, founders of psychoanalysis who were also Jewish. The Göring Institute was well-financed throughout the war with a mandate to create a "New German Psychotherapy". This psychotherapy aimed to align suitable Germans with the Reich's overall goals. As described by one physician, "Despite the importance of analysis, spiritual guidance and the active cooperation of the patient represent the best way to overcome individual mental problems and to subordinate them to the requirements of the Volk and the Gemeinschaft." Psychologists were to provide Seelenführung [lit., soul guidance], the leadership of the mind, to integrate people into the new vision of a German community. Harald Schultz-Hencke melded psychology with the Nazi theory of biology and racial origins, criticizing psychoanalysis as a study of the weak and deformed. Johannes Heinrich Schultz, a German psychologist recognized for developing the technique of autogenic training, prominently advocated sterilization and euthanasia of men considered genetically undesirable, and devised techniques for facilitating this process.

After the war, new institutions were created, although some psychologists, because of their Nazi affiliation, were discredited. Alexander Mitscherlich founded a prominent applied psychoanalysis journal called Psyche. With funding from the Rockefeller Foundation, Mitscherlich established the first clinical psychosomatic medicine division at Heidelberg University. In 1970, psychology was integrated into the required studies of medical students.

After the Russian Revolution, the Bolsheviks promoted psychology as a way to engineer the "New Man" of socialism. Consequently, university psychology departments trained large numbers of students. Upon completion of training, positions were made available to those students in schools, workplaces, cultural institutions, and the military. The Russian state emphasized pedology and the study of child development. Lev Vygotsky became prominent in the field of child development. The Bolsheviks also promoted free love and embraced the doctrine of psychoanalysis as an antidote to sexual repression. Although pedology and intelligence testing fell out of favor in 1936, psychology maintained its privileged position as an instrument of the Soviet Union. Stalinist purges took a heavy toll and instilled a climate of fear in the profession, as elsewhere in Soviet society. Following World War II, Jewish psychologists past and present, including Lev Vygotsky, A.R. Luria, and Aron Zalkind, were denounced; Ivan Pavlov (posthumously) and Stalin himself were celebrated as heroes of Soviet psychology. Soviet academics experienced a degree of liberalization during the Khrushchev Thaw. The topics of cybernetics, linguistics, and genetics became acceptable again. The new field of engineering psychology emerged. The field involves studying the mental aspects of complex jobs, such as that of pilot or cosmonaut). Interdisciplinary studies became popular, and scholars such as Georgy Shchedrovitsky developed systems theory approaches to human behavior.

Twentieth-century Chinese psychology originally modeled itself on U.S. psychology, with translations of works by American authors like William James, the establishment of university psychology departments and journals, and the formation of groups, including the Chinese Association of Psychological Testing (1930) and the Chinese Psychological Society (1937). Chinese psychologists were encouraged to focus on education and language learning. Chinese psychologists were drawn to the idea that education would enable modernization. John Dewey, who lectured to Chinese audiences between 1919 and 1921, had a significant influence on psychology in China. Chancellor T'sai Yuan-p'ei introduced him at Peking University as a greater thinker than Confucius. Kuo Zing-yang who received a PhD at the University of California, Berkeley, became President of Zhejiang University and popularized behaviorism. After the Chinese Communist Party gained control of the country, the Stalinist Soviet Union became the major influence, with Marxism–Leninism the leading social doctrine and Pavlovian conditioning the approved means of behavior change. Chinese psychologists elaborated on Lenin's model of "reflective" consciousness, envisioning an "active consciousness" (pinyin: tzu-chueh neng-tung-li) capable of transcending material conditions through hard work and ideological struggle. They developed a concept of "recognition" (pinyin: jen-shih) which referred to the interface between individual perceptions and the socially accepted worldview; failure to correspond with party doctrine was "incorrect recognition". Psychology education was centralized under the Chinese Academy of Sciences, supervised by the State Council. In 1951, the academy created a Psychology Research Office, which, in 1956, became the Institute of Psychology. Because most leading psychologists were educated in the United States, the academy's primary concern was their re-education in Soviet doctrine. Child psychology and pedagogy for a nationally cohesive education remained a central goal of the discipline.

=== Women in psychology ===
==== 1900–1949 ====
Women in the early 1900s began to make key contributions to the field of psychology. In 1923, Anna Freud, the daughter of Sigmund Freud, built on her father's work using different defense mechanisms (denial, repression, and suppression) to psychoanalyze children. She believed that once a child reached the latency period, child analysis could be used as a mode of therapy. She stated it is important to focus on the child's environment, support their development, and prevent neurosis. She believed a child should be recognized as an individual with their own rights, and that each session should be tailored to the child's specific needs. She encouraged drawing, moving freely, and expressing themselves in any way they could. This helped build a strong therapeutic alliance with child patients, which allows psychologists to observe their normal behavior. She continued her research on the impact of children after family separation, children with socio-economically disadvantaged backgrounds, and all stages of child development from infancy to adolescence.

Functional periodicity, the belief that women are mentally and physically impaired during menstruation, impacted women's rights because employers were less likely to hire them due to the belief they would be incapable of working for one week a month. Leta Stetter Hollingworth wanted to prove this hypothesis and Edward L. Thorndike's theory, that women have lesser psychological and physical traits than men and were simply mediocre, was incorrect. Hollingworth worked to prove that differences were not due to male genetic superiority but to culture. She also included the concept of women's impairment during menstruation in her research. She recorded both women's and men's performances on tasks (cognitive, perceptual, and motor) for three months. No evidence was found of decreased performance due to a woman's menstrual cycle. She also challenged the belief that intelligence is inherited, and women are intellectually inferior to men. She stated that women do not reach positions of power due to the societal norms and roles they are assigned. As she states in her article, "Variability as related to sex differences in achievement: A Critique", the largest problem women have is the social order that was built due to the assumption women have less interests and abilities than men. To further prove her point, she conducted another experiment with infants who had not been influenced by social norms, such as the belief that adult men receive more opportunities than women. She found no differences among infants other than size. After this research contradicted the original hypothesis, Hollingworth showed that there is no difference between the physiological and psychological traits of men and women, and that women are not impaired during menstruation.

New theories emerged in the first half of the 1900s, marking a turning point in women's recognition in the field of psychology. In addition to the contributions made by Leta Stetter Hollingworth and Anna Freud, Mary Whiton Calkins invented the paired associates technique of studying memory and developed self-psychology. Karen Horney developed the concept of "womb envy" and neurotic needs. Psychoanalyst Melanie Klein impacted developmental psychology with her research of play therapy. These great discoveries and contributions were made during struggles of sexism, discrimination, and little recognition for their work.

==== 1950–1999 ====
Women in the second half of the 20th century continued to do research that had large-scale impacts on the field of psychology. Mary Ainsworth's work centered around attachment theory. Building on the work of fellow psychologist John Bowlby, Ainsworth spent years conducting fieldwork to understand the development of mother-infant relationships. In conducting this field research, Ainsworth developed the Strange Situation Procedure, a laboratory procedure designed to study attachment style by repeatedly separating and reuniting a child with their mother under different circumstances. These field studies are also where she developed her attachment theory and the order of attachment styles, which was a landmark for developmental psychology. Because of her work, Ainsworth became one of the most cited psychologists of all time. Mamie Phipps Clark was another woman in psychology that changed the field with her research. She was one of the first African-Americans to receive a doctoral degree in psychology from Columbia University, along with her husband, Kenneth Clark. Her master's thesis, "The Development of Consciousness in Negro Pre-School Children," argued that Black children's self-esteem was adversely affected by racial discrimination. She and her husband conducted research throughout the 1940s. These tests, called the doll tests, asked young children to choose between identical dolls that differed only in race, and most children preferred the white dolls and attributed positive traits to them. Repeated over and over again, these tests helped to establish the negative effects of racial discrimination and segregation on black children's self-image and development. In 1954, this research would help decide the landmark Brown v. Board of Education decision, leading to the end of legal segregation across the nation. Clark went on to be an influential figure in psychology, her work continuing to focus on minority youth.

As the field of psychology developed in the latter half of the 20th century, women in the field advocated for their voices to be heard and their perspectives valued. Second-wave feminism did not miss psychology. An outspoken feminist in psychology was Naomi Weisstein, who was an accomplished researcher in psychology and neuroscience, and is perhaps best known for her paper, "Kirche, Kuche, Kinder as Scientific Law: Psychology Constructs the Female." Psychology Constructs the Female criticized the field of psychology for centering men and using biology too much to explain gender differences without taking into account social factors. Her work set the stage for further research to be done in social psychology, especially in gender construction. Other women in the field also continued advocating for women in psychology, creating the Association for Women in Psychology to criticize how the field treated women. E. Kitsch Childs, Phyllis Chesler, and Dorothy Riddle were some of the founding members of the organization in 1969.

The latter half of the 20th century further diversified the field of psychology, with women of color reaching new milestones. In 1962, Martha Bernal became the first Latina woman to get a Ph.D. in psychology. In 1969, Marigold Linton, the first Native American woman to get a Ph.D. in psychology, founded the National Indian Education Association. She was also a founding member of the Society for Advancement of Chicanos and Native Americans in Science. In 1971, the Network of Indian Psychologists was established by Carolyn Attneave. Harriet McAdoo was appointed to the White House Conference on Families in 1979.

==== 21st century ====
In the 21st century, women have gained greater prominence in psychology, contributing significantly to a wide range of subfields. Many have taken on leadership roles, directed influential research labs, and guided the next generation of psychologists. However, gender disparities persist, disadvantaging women in pay and representation in senior academic positions. The number of women pursuing education and training in psychological science has reached a record high. In the United States, estimates suggest that women make up about 78% of undergraduate students and 71% of graduate students in psychology.

== Disciplinary organizations ==
=== Institutions ===
In 1920, Édouard Claparède and Pierre Bovet created a new applied psychology organization called the International Congress of Psychotechnics Applied to Vocational Guidance, later called the International Congress of Psychotechnics and then the International Association of Applied Psychology. The IAAP is considered the oldest international psychology association. As of 2003, at least 65 international groups deal with specialized aspects of psychology. In response to male predominance in the field, female psychologists in the U.S. formed the National Council of Women Psychologists in 1941. This organization became the International Council of Women Psychologists after World War II and the International Council of Psychologists in 1959. Several associations, including the Association of Black Psychologists and the Asian American Psychological Association, have arisen to promote the inclusion of non-European racial groups in the profession.

The International Union of Psychological Science (IUPsyS) is the world federation of national psychological societies. The IUPsyS was founded in 1951 under the auspices of the United Nations Educational, Scientific and Cultural Organization (UNESCO). Psychology departments have since proliferated around the world, based primarily on the Euro-American model. Since 1966, the Union has published the International Journal of Psychology. IAAP and IUPsyS agreed in 1976 each to hold a congress every four years, on a staggered basis.

IUPsyS recognizes 66 national psychology associations, and at least 15 others exist. The American Psychological Association is the oldest and largest. Its membership has increased from 5,000 in 1945 to 100,000 as of 2012. The APA includes 54 divisions, which, since 1960, have steadily proliferated to include more specialties. Some of these divisions, such as the Society for the Psychological Study of Social Issues and the American Psychology–Law Society, began as autonomous groups.

The Interamerican Psychological Society, founded in 1951, aspires to promote psychology across the Western Hemisphere. It hosted the Interamerican Congress of Psychology and had 1,000 members in 2000. The European Federation of Professional Psychology Associations, founded in 1981, represents 30 national associations with a total of 100,000 individual members. At least 30 other international organizations represent psychologists in different regions.

In some places, governments legally regulate who can provide psychological services or represent themselves as a "psychologist". The APA defines a psychologist as someone with a doctoral degree in psychology.

=== Boundaries ===
Early practitioners of experimental psychology distinguished themselves from parapsychology, which in the late nineteenth century enjoyed popularity (including the interest of scholars such as William James). Some people considered parapsychology to be part of "psychology". Parapsychology, hypnotism, and psychism were major topics at the early International Congresses. But students in these fields were eventually ostracized and, more or less, banished from the Congress in 1900–1905. Parapsychology persisted for a time at Imperial University in Japan, with publications such as Clairvoyance and Thoughtography by Tomokichi Fukurai, but it was mostly shunned by 1913.

As a discipline, psychology has long sought to fend off accusations that it is a "soft" science. Philosopher of science Thomas Kuhn's 1962 critique implied that psychology, overall, was in a pre-paradigm state, lacking agreement on the type of overarching theory found in mature hard sciences such as chemistry and physics. Because some areas of psychology rely on research methods such as self-reports in surveys and questionnaires, critics asserted that psychology is not an objective science. Skeptics have suggested that personality, thinking, and emotion cannot be directly measured and are often inferred from subjective self-reports, which may be problematic. Experimental psychologists have devised a variety of ways to measure these elusive phenomenological entities indirectly.

Divisions still exist within the field, with some psychologists more oriented towards the unique experiences of individual humans, which cannot be understood only as data points within a larger population. Critics inside and outside the field have argued that mainstream psychology has become increasingly dominated by a "cult of empiricism", which limits the scope of research by restricting investigators to methods derived from the physical sciences. Feminist critiques have argued that claims to scientific objectivity obscure the values and agenda of (historically) mostly male researchers. Jean Grimshaw, for example, argues that mainstream psychological research has advanced a patriarchal agenda through its efforts to control behavior.

== Major schools of thought ==
=== Neuropsychology and Neurosciences ===
Dissociation involves identifying the neural substrate of a particular brain function.

Neuropsychology concerns relationships between brain function and behavior. It examines how the structure and functioning of the nervous system influence cognitive processes, emotions, and behavior. Neuropsychological research investigates how specific brain regions contribute to functions such as memory, language, attention, perception, executive control, and emotional regulation. A major source of evidence comes from studying individuals with brain injuries, neurodegenerative diseases, or developmental abnormalities. By observing patterns of cognitive impairment associated with particular forms of brain damage, neuropsychologists infer the functions of affected neural systems. One of the first books with the word neuropsychology in the title was Organization of Behavior - A Neuropsychological Theory published in 1949. Another early influential book in this field was Alexander Luria's magnum opus, Higher Cortical Functions in Man (1962). Contemporary neuropsychology is undergoing a rapid transformation thanks to advances in neuroimaging, natural language processing, artificial intelligence and virtual reality. There is an increasing emphasis on ecological validity, digital biomarkers, and the personalization of clinical neuropsychological diagnosis and rehabilitation.

Neuropsychology is classified under the broader category of neurosciences or biological psychology—fields that examine how the brain, nervous system, endocrine system, and genetic factors influence psychological processes.

=== Comparative and Evolutionary ===
Evolutionary psychology approaches thought and behavior from a modern evolutionary perspective. This perspective suggests that psychological adaptations evolved to solve recurrent problems in human ancestral environments. Evolutionary psychologists attempt to find out how human psychological traits are evolved adaptations, the results of natural selection or sexual selection over the course of human evolution.

Comparative psychology (in some languages called zoopsychology) studies behavior and mental processes across different species. By comparing humans with non-human animals and comparing animal species with one another, researchers seek to identify both shared and unique psychological mechanisms. The field is closely connected to evolutionary theory and assumes that many aspects of behavior and cognition have developed through natural selection. The origins of comparative psychology can be traced to the work of Charles Darwin, whose theory of evolution suggested continuity between human and animal minds. Early comparative psychologists investigated learning, instinct, sensory processes, and problem-solving abilities in animals. Modern research encompasses a wide range of topics, including memory, communication, social behavior, decision-making, and consciousness. Comparative psychology employs both laboratory and field methods. Researchers may examine behavioral differences between species, study animal cognition under controlled conditions, or observe animals in their natural environments. Findings from comparative psychology contribute to understanding the evolutionary origins of human cognition and behavior and provide insights into the adaptive significance of psychological processes.

=== Behaviorist ===
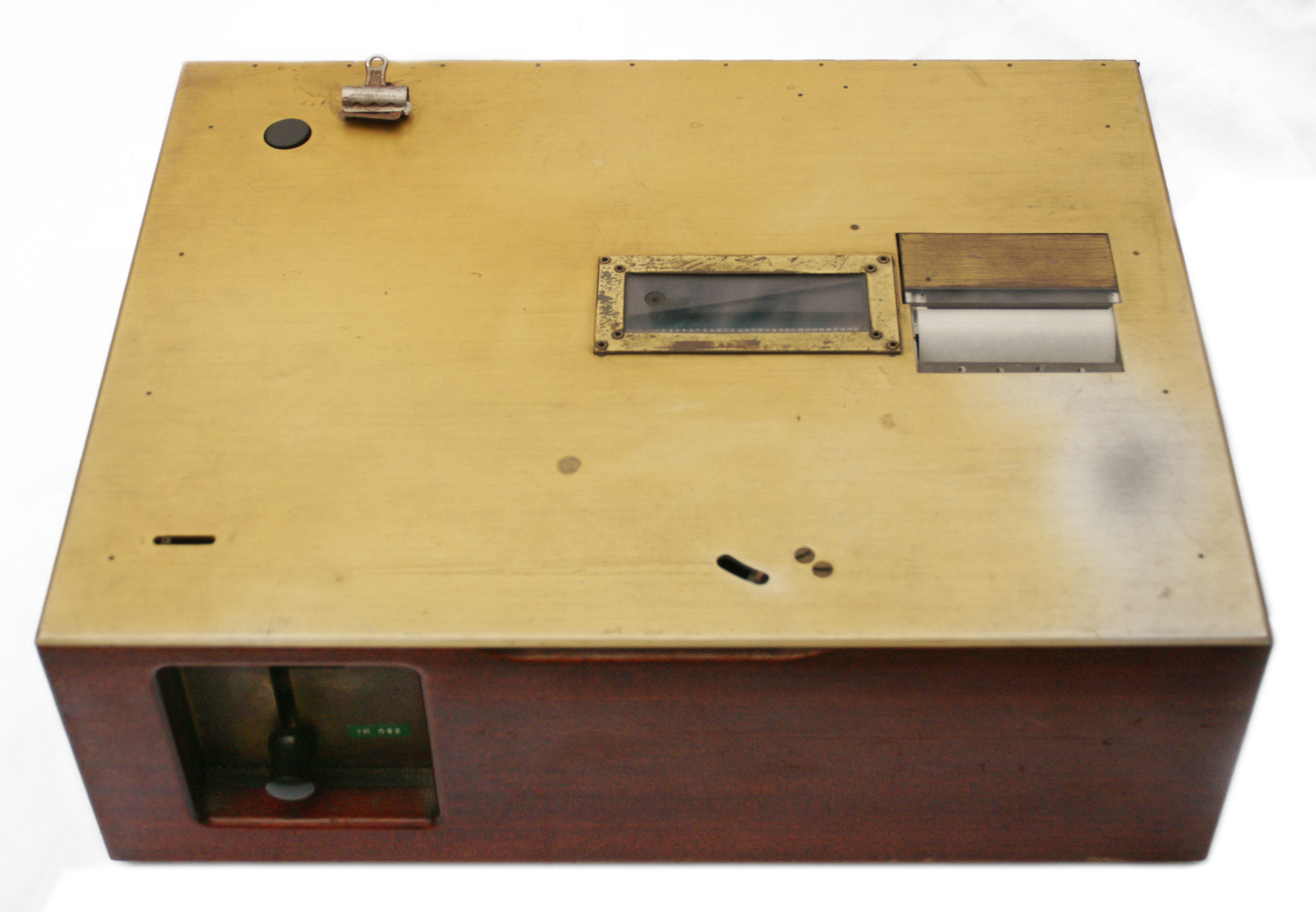
Skinner's teaching machine, a mechanical invention to automate the task of programmed instruction

The film of the Little Albert experiment

A tenet of behavioral research is that a large part of both human and other animal behavior is learned and that the mechanisms involved in learning apply to both humans and non-human animals. Behavioral researchers have developed a treatment known as behavior modification to help individuals replace undesirable behaviors with desirable ones.

Early behavioral researchers studied stimulus–response pairings, now known as classical conditioning. They demonstrated that when a biologically potent stimulus (e.g., food that elicits salivation) is paired with a previously neutral stimulus (e.g., a bell) over several learning trials, the neutral stimulus can, by itself, come to elicit the response the biologically potent stimulus elicits. Ivan Pavlov—known best for inducing dogs to salivate in the presence of a stimulus previously linked with food—became a leading figure in the Soviet Union and inspired followers to use his methods on humans. In the United States, Edward Lee Thorndike initiated "connectionist" studies by trapping animals in "puzzle boxes" and rewarding them for escaping. Thorndike wrote in 1911, "There can be no moral warrant for studying man's nature unless the study will enable us to control his acts." From 1910 to 1913, the American Psychological Association underwent a major change in orientation, away from mentalism and towards "behavioralism". In 1913, John B. Watson coined the term behaviorism for this school of thought. Watson's famous Little Albert experiment in 1920 was at first thought to demonstrate that repeated use of upsetting loud noises could instill phobias (aversions to other stimuli) in an infant human, although such a conclusion was likely an exaggeration. Karl Lashley, a close collaborator with Watson, examined biological manifestations of learning in the brain.

Clark L. Hull, Edwin Guthrie, and others did much to help behaviorism become a widely used paradigm. A new method of "instrumental" or "operant" conditioning added the concepts of reinforcement and punishment to the model of behavior change. Radical behaviorists avoided discussing the inner workings of the mind, especially the unconscious mind, which they considered impossible to assess scientifically. Operant conditioning was first described by Miller and Kanorski and popularized in the U.S. by B.F. Skinner, who emerged as a leading intellectual of the behaviorist movement.

Noam Chomsky published an influential critique of radical behaviorism, arguing that behaviorist principles could not adequately explain the complex mental process of language acquisition and language use. The review, which was scathing, did much to reduce the status of behaviorism within psychology. Martin Seligman and his colleagues discovered that they could condition in dogs a state of "learned helplessness", which was not predicted by the behaviorist approach to psychology. Edward C. Tolman advanced a hybrid "cognitive behavioral" model, most notably with his 1948 publication discussing the cognitive maps used by rats to guess at the location of food at the end of a maze. Skinner's behaviorism did not die, in part because it generated successful practical applications.

The Association for Behavior Analysis International was founded in 1974 and by 2003 had members from 42 countries. The field has gained a foothold in Latin America and Japan. Applied behavior analysis is the term used for the application of the principles of operant conditioning to change socially significant behavior (it supersedes the term, "behavior modification").

=== Cognitive ===
Green Red Blue
Purple Blue Purple

Blue Purple Red
Green Purple Green

The Stroop effect is the fact that naming the color of the first set of words is easier and quicker than the second set.

Baddeley's model of working memory

The Müller–Lyer illusion. Psychologists make inferences about mental processes from shared phenomena such as optical illusions.

Cognitive psychology involves the study of mental processes, including perception, attention, language comprehension and production, memory, and problem solving. Researchers in the field of cognitive psychology are sometimes called cognitivists. They rely on an information processing model of mental functioning. Cognitivist research is informed by functionalism and experimental psychology.

Starting in the 1950s, the experimental techniques developed by Wundt, James, Ebbinghaus, and others re-emerged as experimental psychology became increasingly cognitivist and, eventually, became part of the wider, interdisciplinary field of cognitive science. Some called this development the cognitive revolution because it rejected the anti-mentalist dogma of behaviorism as well as the strictures of psychoanalysis.

Albert Bandura helped along the transition in psychology from behaviorism to cognitive psychology. Bandura and other social learning theorists advanced the idea of vicarious learning. In other words, they advanced the view that a child can learn by observing the immediate social environment and not necessarily from having been reinforced for enacting a behavior, although they did not rule out the influence of reinforcement on learning a behavior.

Technological advances also renewed interest in mental states and mental representations. English neuroscientist Charles Sherrington and Canadian psychologist Donald O. Hebb used experimental methods to link psychological phenomena to the brain's structure and function. The rise of computer science, cybernetics, and artificial intelligence underlined the value of comparing information processing in humans and machines.

A popular and representative topic in this area is cognitive bias, or irrational thought. Psychologists (and economists) have classified and described a sizeable catalog of biases which recur frequently in human thought. The availability heuristic, for example, is the tendency to overestimate the importance of something that happens to come readily to mind.

Elements of behaviorism and cognitive psychology were synthesized to form cognitive behavioral therapy, a form of psychotherapy modified from techniques developed by American psychologist Albert Ellis and American psychiatrist Aaron T. Beck.

On a broader level, cognitive science is an interdisciplinary enterprise involving cognitive psychologists, cognitive neuroscientists, linguists, and researchers in artificial intelligence, human–computer interaction, and computational neuroscience. The discipline of cognitive science covers cognitive psychology as well as philosophy of mind, computer science, and neuroscience. Computer simulations are sometimes used to model phenomena of interest.

=== Social ===
Social psychology is concerned with how behaviors, thoughts, feelings, and the social environment influence human interactions. Social psychologists study such topics as the influence of others on an individual's behavior (e.g. conformity, persuasion) and the formation of beliefs, attitudes, and stereotypes about other people. Social cognition fuses elements of social and cognitive psychology for the purpose of understanding how people process, remember, or distort social information. The study of group dynamics involves research on the nature of leadership, organizational communication, and related phenomena. In recent years, social psychologists have become interested in implicit measures, mediational models, and the interaction of person and social factors in accounting for behavior. Some concepts that sociologists have applied to the study of psychiatric disorders, concepts such as the social role, sick role, social class, life events, culture, migration, and total institution, have influenced social psychologists.

=== Psychoanalytic ===
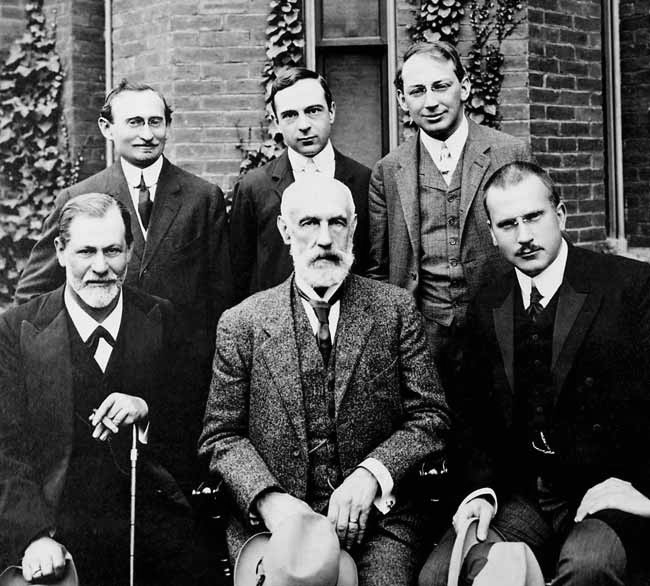
Front row: Sigmund Freud, G. Stanley Hall, Carl Jung. Back row: Abraham A. Brill, Ernest Jones, Sándor Ferenczi at Clark University in 1909.

Psychoanalysis is a collection of theories and therapeutic techniques intended to analyze the unconscious mind and its impact on everyday life. These theories and techniques inform treatments for mental disorders. Psychoanalysis originated in the 1890s, most prominently with the work of Sigmund Freud. Freud's psychoanalytic theory was largely based on interpretive methods, introspection, and clinical observation. It became very well known, largely because it tackled subjects such as sexuality, repression, and the unconscious. Freud pioneered the methods of free association and dream interpretation.

Psychoanalytic theory is not monolithic. Other well-known psychoanalytic thinkers who diverged from Freud include Alfred Adler, Carl Jung, Erik Erikson, Melanie Klein, D. W. Winnicott, Karen Horney, Erich Fromm, John Bowlby, Freud's daughter Anna Freud, and Harry Stack Sullivan. These individuals ensured that psychoanalysis would evolve into diverse schools of thought. Among these schools are ego psychology, object relations, and interpersonal, Lacanian, and relational psychoanalysis.

Psychologists such as Hans Eysenck and philosophers including Karl Popper sharply criticized psychoanalysis. Popper argued that psychoanalysis was not falsifiable (no claim it made could be proven wrong) and therefore inherently not a scientific discipline, whereas Eysenck advanced the view that experimental data had contradicted psychoanalytic tenets. By the end of the 20th century, psychology departments in American universities mostly had marginalized Freudian theory, dismissing it as a "desiccated and dead" historical artifact. Researchers such as António Damásio, Oliver Sacks, and Joseph LeDoux; and individuals in the emerging field of neuro-psychoanalysis have defended some of Freud's ideas on scientific grounds.

=== Existential-humanistic ===
Psychologist Abraham Maslow in 1943 posited that humans have a hierarchy of needs, and that fulfilling basic needs ordinarily should precede the fulfillment of higher-order needs.

Humanistic psychology, which has been influenced by existentialism and phenomenology, stresses free will and self-actualization. It emerged in the 1950s as a movement within academic psychology, in reaction to both behaviorism and psychoanalysis. The humanistic approach seeks to view the whole person, not just fragmented parts of the personality or isolated cognitions. Humanistic psychology also focuses on personal growth, self-identity, death, aloneness, and freedom. It emphasizes subjective meaning, the rejection of determinism, and concern for positive growth rather than pathology. Some founders of the humanistic school of thought were American psychologists Abraham Maslow, who formulated a hierarchy of human needs, and Carl Rogers, who created and developed client-centered therapy.

Later, positive psychology brought humanistic themes into scientific study. Positive psychology is the study of factors that contribute to human happiness and well-being, with a greater focus on people who are currently healthy. In 2010, Clinical Psychological Review published a special issue devoted to positive psychological interventions, such as gratitude journaling and the physical expression of gratitude. It is, however, far from clear that positive psychology is effective in making people happier. Positive psychological interventions have been limited in scope, but their effects are thought to be somewhat better than placebo effects.

The American Association for Humanistic Psychology, formed in 1963, declared:

Humanistic psychology is primarily an orientation toward the whole of psychology rather than a distinct area or school. It stands for respect for the worth of persons, respect for differences of approach, open-mindedness as to acceptable methods, and interest in exploration of new aspects of human behavior. As a "third force" in contemporary psychology, it is concerned with topics having little place in existing theories and systems: e.g., love, creativity, self, growth, organism, basic need-gratification, self-actualization, higher values, being, becoming, spontaneity, play, humor, affection, naturalness, warmth, ego-transcendence, objectivity, autonomy, responsibility, meaning, fair-play, transcendental experience, peak experience, courage, and related concepts.

Existential psychology emphasizes the need to understand a client's total orientation towards the world. Existential psychology is opposed to reductionism, behaviorism, and other methods that objectify the individual. In the 1950s and 1960s, influenced by philosophers Søren Kierkegaard and Martin Heidegger, psychoanalytically trained American psychologist Rollo May helped to develop existential psychology. Existential psychotherapy, which follows from existential psychology, is a therapeutic approach that is based on the idea that a person's inner conflict arises from that individual's confrontation with the givens of existence. Swiss psychoanalyst Ludwig Binswanger and American psychologist George Kelly may also be said to belong to the existential school. Existential psychologists tend to differ from more "humanistic" psychologists in the former's relatively neutral view of human nature and relatively positive assessment of anxiety. Existential psychologists emphasized the humanistic themes of death, free will, and meaning, suggesting that myths and narratives can shape meaning; meaning can be deepened by the acceptance of free will, which is requisite to living an authentic life, albeit often with death anxiety.

Austrian existential psychiatrist and Holocaust survivor Viktor Frankl drew evidence of meaning's therapeutic power from reflections upon his own internment. He created a variation of existential psychotherapy called logotherapy, a type of existentialist analysis that focuses on a will to meaning (in one's life), as opposed to Adler's Nietzschean doctrine of will to power or Freud's will to pleasure.

== Themes ==
=== Personality ===
Personality psychology is concerned with enduring patterns of behavior, thought, and emotion. Theories of personality vary across different psychological schools of thought. Each theory carries different assumptions about such features as the role of the unconscious and the importance of childhood experience. According to Freud, personality is based on the dynamic interactions of the id, ego, and super-ego. By contrast, trait theorists have developed taxonomies of personality constructs in describing personality in terms of key traits. Trait theorists have often employed statistical data-reduction methods, such as factor analysis. Although the number of proposed traits has varied widely, Hans Eysenck's early biologically based model suggests at least three major trait constructs are necessary to describe human personality: extraversion–introversion, neuroticism-stability, and psychoticism-normality. Raymond Cattell empirically derived a theory of 16 personality factors at the primary-factor level and up to eight broader second-stratum factors. Since the 1980s, the Big Five (openness to experience, conscientiousness, extraversion, agreeableness, and neuroticism) emerged as an important trait theory of personality. Dimensional models of personality disorders are receiving increasing support, and a version of dimensional assessment, namely the Alternative DSM-5 Model for Personality Disorders, has been included in the DSM-5. However, despite a wealth of research on the various versions of the "Big Five" personality dimensions, it appears necessary to move from static conceptualizations of personality structure to a more dynamic orientation, acknowledging that personality constructs are subject to learning and change over the lifespan.

An early example of personality assessment was the Woodworth Personal Data Sheet, constructed during World War I. The popular, although psychometrically inadequate, Myers–Briggs Type Indicator was developed to assess individuals' "personality types" according to the personality theories of Carl Jung. The Minnesota Multiphasic Personality Inventory (MMPI), despite its name, is more a dimensional measure of psychopathology than a personality measure. California Psychological Inventory contains 20 personality scales (e.g., independence, tolerance). The International Personality Item Pool, which is in the public domain, has become a source of scales that can be used for personality assessment.

=== Unconscious mind ===
The study of the unconscious mind, a part of the psyche outside the individual's awareness but that is believed to influence conscious thought and behavior, was a hallmark of early psychology. In one of the first psychology experiments conducted in the United States, C.S. Peirce and Joseph Jastrow found in 1884 that research subjects could choose the minutely heavier of two weights even if consciously uncertain of the difference. Freud popularized the concept of the unconscious mind, particularly when he referred to an uncensored intrusion of unconscious thought into one's speech (a Freudian slip) or to his efforts to interpret dreams. His 1901 book The Psychopathology of Everyday Life catalogs hundreds of everyday events that Freud explains in terms of unconscious influence. Pierre Janet advanced the idea of a subconscious mind, which could contain autonomous mental elements outside the subject's direct awareness.

The concept of unconscious processes has remained important in psychology. Cognitive psychologists have used a "filter" model of attention. According to the model, much information processing occurs below the threshold of consciousness, and only certain stimuli, limited in number and nature, make their way through the filter. Research has shown that subconscious priming of certain ideas can covertly influence thoughts and behavior. Because of the unreliability of self-reporting, a major hurdle in this type of research involves demonstrating that a subject's conscious mind has not perceived a target stimulus. For this reason, some psychologists prefer to distinguish between implicit and explicit memory. In another approach, one can also describe a subliminal stimulus as meeting an objective but not a subjective threshold.

Some experimental data suggest that the brain begins to consider taking actions before the mind becomes aware of them. The influence of unconscious forces on people's choices bears on the philosophical question of free will. John Bargh, Daniel Wegner, and Ellen Langer describe free will as an illusion.

=== Motivation ===
Some psychologists study motivation, or the subject of why people or lower animals initiate a behavior at a particular time. It also involves studying why humans and lower animals continue or terminate a behavior. Psychologists such as William James initially used the term motivation to refer to intention, in a sense similar to the concept of will in European philosophy. With the steady rise of Darwinian and Freudian thinking, instinct also came to be seen as a primary source of motivation. According to drive theory, the forces of instinct combine into a single source of energy that exerts a constant influence. Psychoanalysis, like biology, regarded these forces as demands originating in the nervous system. Psychoanalysts believed that these forces, especially the sexual instincts, could become entangled and transmuted within the psyche. Classical psychoanalysis conceives of a struggle between the pleasure principle and the reality principle, roughly corresponding to the id and the ego. Later, in Beyond the Pleasure Principle, Freud introduced the concept of the death drive, a compulsion towards aggression, destruction, and psychic repetition of traumatic events. Meanwhile, behaviorist researchers used simple dichotomous models (pleasure/pain, reward/punishment) and well-established principles such as the idea that a thirsty creature will take pleasure in drinking. Clark Hull formalized the latter idea with his drive reduction model.

Hunger, thirst, fear, sexual desire, and thermoregulation constitute fundamental motivations in animals. Humans seem to exhibit a more complex set of motivations, though theoretically these could be explained as resulting from desires for belonging, positive self-image, self-consistency, truth, love, and control.

Motivation can be modulated in many ways. Researchers have found that eating, for example, depends not only on the organism's fundamental need for homeostasis—an important factor causing the experience of hunger—but also on circadian rhythms, food availability, food palatability, and cost. Abstract motivations are also malleable, as evidenced by such phenomena as goal contagion: the adoption of goals, sometimes unconsciously, based on inferences about the goals of others. Vohs and Baumeister suggest that contrary to the need-desire-fulfillment cycle of animal instincts, human motivations sometimes obey a "getting begets wanting" rule: the more you get a reward such as self-esteem, love, drugs, or money, the more you want it. They suggest that this principle can even apply to food, drink, sex, and sleep.

=== Development psychology ===
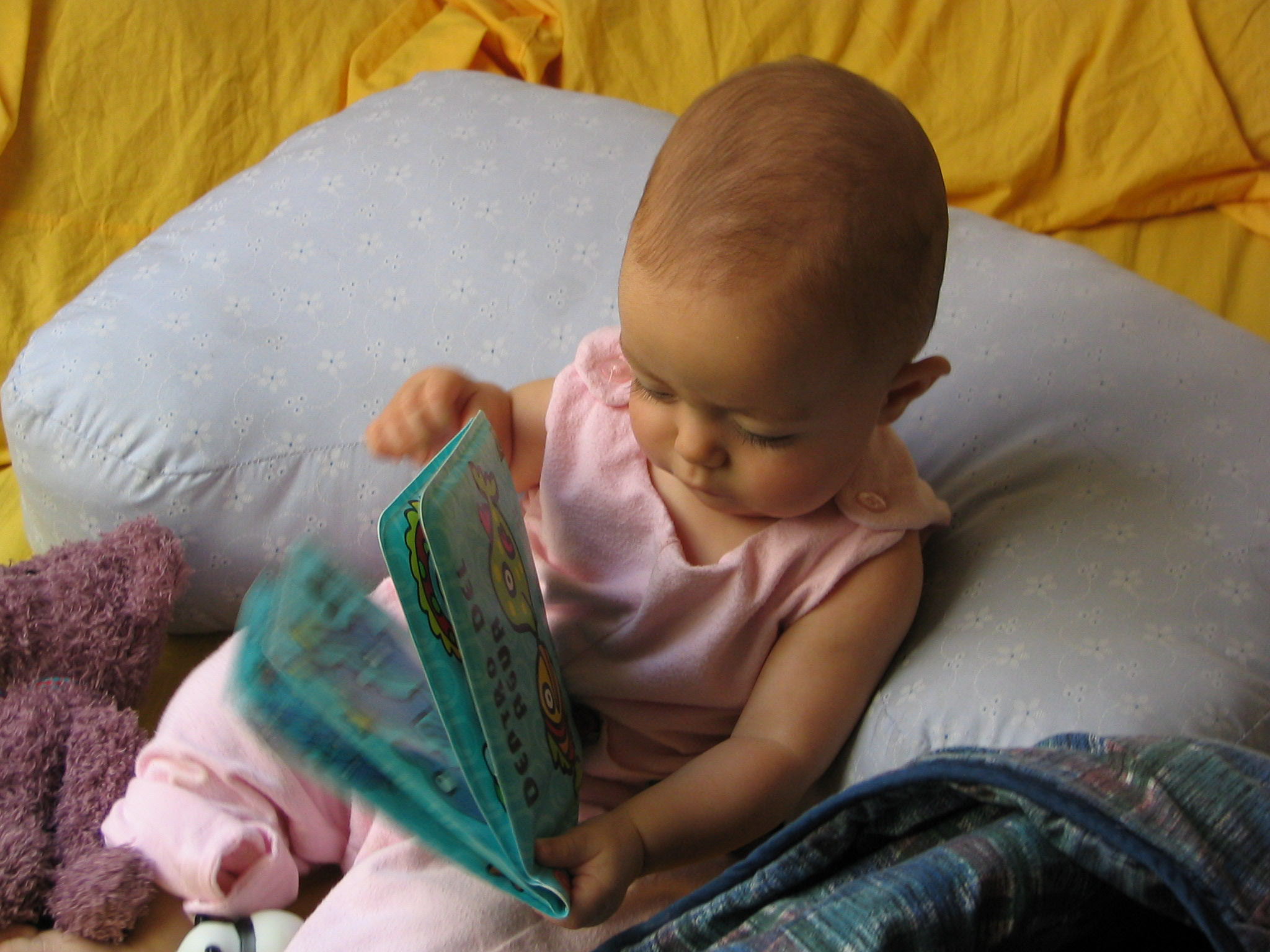
Developmental psychologists engage a child with a book and then make observations based on how the child interacts with the object.

Developmental psychology is the scientific study of how and why the thought processes, emotions, and behaviors of humans change over the course of their lives. Some credit Charles Darwin with conducting the first systematic study within the rubric of developmental psychology, having published in 1877 a short paper detailing the development of innate forms of communication based on his observations of his infant son. The main origins of the discipline, however, are found in the work of Jean Piaget. Like Piaget, developmental psychologists originally focused primarily on cognitive development from infancy to adolescence. Later, developmental psychology expanded to include the study of cognition across the life span. In addition to studying cognition, developmental psychologists have also come to focus on affective, behavioral, moral, social, and neural development.

Developmental psychologists who study children use several research methods. For example, they make observations of children in natural settings such as preschools and engage them in experimental tasks. Such tasks often resemble specially designed games and activities that are both enjoyable for the child and scientifically useful. Developmental researchers have even devised clever methods to study the mental processes of infants. In addition to studying children, developmental psychologists also study aging and processes throughout the life span, including old age. These psychologists draw on the full range of psychological theories to inform their research.

=== Genes and environment ===
All researched psychological traits are influenced by both genes and environment, to varying degrees. These two sources of influence are often confounded in observational research of individuals and families. An example of this confounding can be shown in the transmission of depression from a depressed mother to her offspring. A theory based on environmental transmission would hold that an offspring, by virtue of their having a problematic rearing environment managed by a depressed mother, is at risk for developing depression. On the other hand, a hereditarian theory would hold that biological parents' genes affect depression risk in an offspring. Genes and environment are completely confounded in these simple transmission models. A depressed mother may both carry genes that contribute to depression in her offspring and also create a rearing environment that increases the risk of depression in her child.

Behavioral genetics researchers have employed methodologies that help to disentangle this confound and understand the nature and origins of individual differences in behavior. Traditionally, the research has involved twin studies and adoption or cross-fostering studies, two designs where genetic and environmental influences can be partially unconfounded. More recently, gene-focused research has contributed to understanding genetic contributions to the development of psychological traits.

The availability of microarray molecular genetic or genome sequencing technologies allows researchers to measure participant DNA variation directly, and test whether individual genetic variants within genes are associated with psychological traits and psychopathology through methods including genome-wide association studies. One goal of such research is similar to that in positional cloning and its success in Huntington's: once a causal gene is discovered, biological research can be conducted to understand how that gene influences the phenotype. One major result of genetic association studies is the general finding that psychological traits and psychopathology, as well as complex medical diseases, are highly polygenic, where a large number (on the order of hundreds to thousands) of genetic variants, each of small effect, contribute to individual differences in the behavioral trait or propensity to the disorder. Active research continues to work toward understanding the genetic and environmental bases of behavior and their interaction.

== Applications ==
Psychology encompasses many subfields and includes different approaches to the study of mental processes and behavior.

=== Psychological testing ===
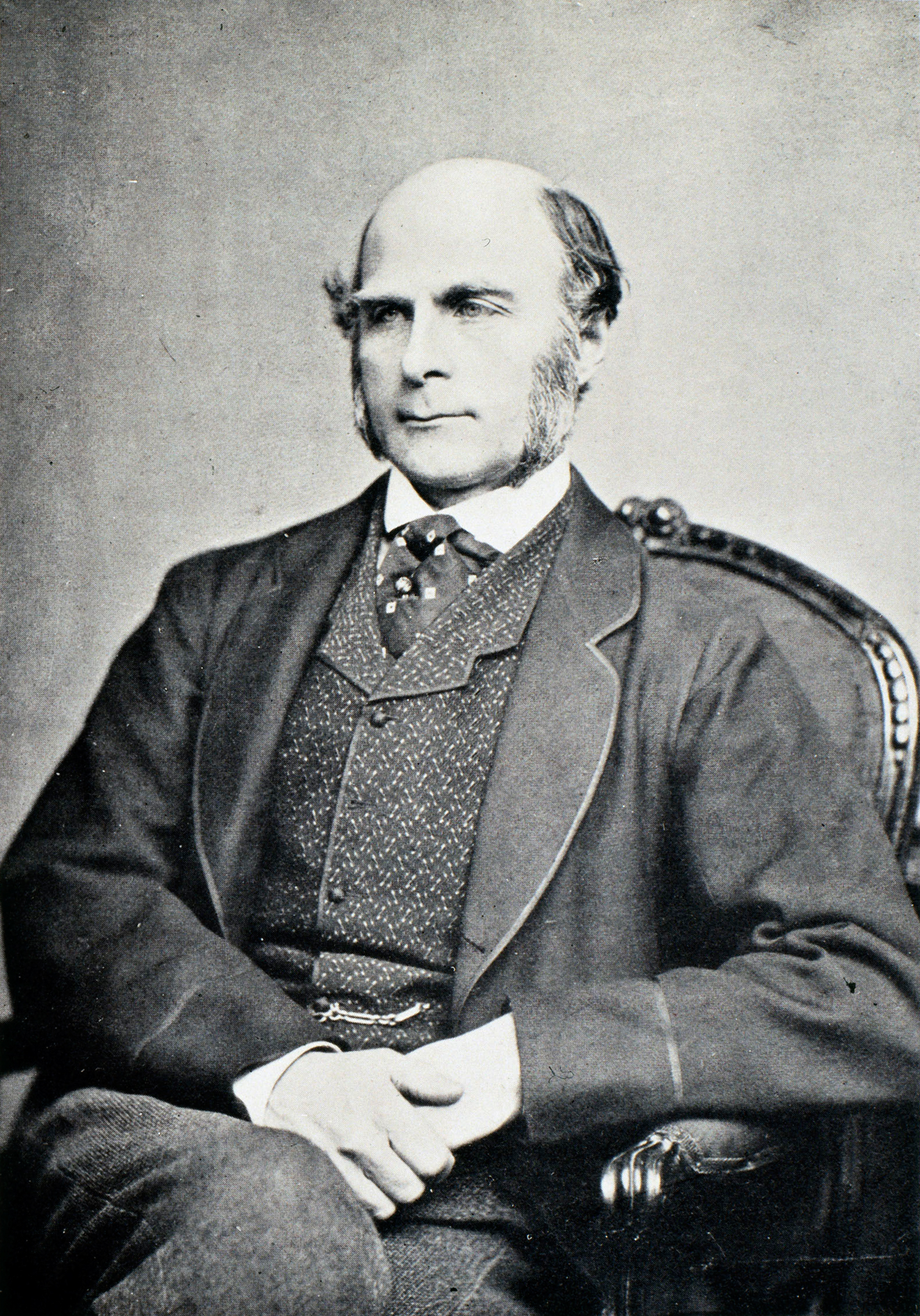
Francis Galton, a pioneer of the experimental psychology field

Psychological testing has ancient origins, dating back to 2200 BCE in the examinations for the Chinese civil service. Written exams began during the Han dynasty (202 BCE – 220 CE). By 1370, the Chinese system required a stratified series of tests, involving essay writing and knowledge of diverse topics. The system ended in 1906. In Europe, mental assessment took a different approach, with theories of physiognomy—judgment of character based on the face—described by Aristotle in 4th century BCE Greece. Physiognomy remained current through the Enlightenment and was later supplemented by phrenology: the idea that mental traits are related to bumps on the head.

When experimental psychology came to Britain, Francis Galton was a leading practitioner. By virtue of his procedures for measuring reaction time and sensation, he is considered an inventor of modern mental testing (also known as psychometrics). James McKeen Cattell, a student of Wundt and Galton, brought the idea of psychological testing to the United States, and in fact coined the term "mental test". In 1901, Cattell's student Clark Wissler published discouraging results, suggesting that mental testing of Columbia and Barnard students failed to predict academic performance. In response to 1904 orders from the Minister of Public Instruction, one example of an observational study was run by Arthur Bandura. This observational study focused on children exposed to an adult exhibiting aggressive behavior and their reactions to toys, compared with other children not exposed to these stimuli. The result shows that children who had seen the adult acting aggressively towards a toy, in turn, were aggressive towards their own toy when put in a situation that frustrated them. Psychologists Alfred Binet and Théodore Simon developed and elaborated a new test of intelligence in 1905–1911. They used a range of questions, diverse in their nature and difficulty. Binet and Simon introduced the concept of mental age and referred to the lowest scorers on their test as idiots. Henry H. Goddard put the Binet-Simon scale to work and introduced classifications of mental level such as imbecile and feebleminded. In 1916, (after Binet's death), Stanford professor Lewis M. Terman modified the Binet-Simon scale (renamed the Stanford–Binet scale) and introduced the intelligence quotient as a score report. Based on his test findings, and reflecting the racism common to that era, Terman concluded that intellectual disability "represents the level of intelligence which is very, very common among Spanish-Indians and Mexican families of the Southwest and also among negroes. Their dullness seems to be racial."

Psychologist Robert Yerkes developed the Army Alpha and Army Beta tests in 1917, which were then used in World War I by industrial and organizational psychologists for large-scale employee testing and the selection of military personnel. Mental testing also became popular in the U.S., where it was applied to schoolchildren. The federally created National Intelligence Test was administered to 7 million children in the 1920s. In 1926, the College Entrance Examination Board created the Scholastic Aptitude Test to standardize college admissions. The results of intelligence tests were used to argue for segregated schools and economic functions, including the preferential training of Black Americans for manual labor. These practices were criticized by Black intellectuals such as Horace Mann Bond and Allison Davis. Eugenicists used mental testing to justify and organize compulsory sterilization of individuals classified as mentally retarded (now referred to as intellectual disability). In the United States, tens of thousands of men and women were sterilized. Setting a precedent that has never been overturned, the U.S. Supreme Court affirmed the constitutionality of this practice in the 1927 case Buck v. Bell.

Today, mental testing is a routine phenomenon for people of all ages in Western societies. Modern testing aspires to criteria including standardization of procedure, consistency of results, output of an interpretable score, statistical norms describing population outcomes, and, ideally, effective prediction of behavior and life outcomes outside of testing situations. Psychological testing is regularly used in forensic contexts to aid legal judgments and decisions. Developments in psychometrics include work on test and scale reliability and validity. Developments in item-response theory, structural equation modeling, and bifactor analysis have helped in strengthening test and scale construction.

=== Mental health care ===
The provision of psychological health services is generally referred to as clinical psychology in the United States. However, members of the school psychology and counseling psychology professions sometimes engage in practices that resemble those of clinical psychologists. Clinical psychologists typically include people who have graduated from doctoral programs in clinical psychology. In Canada, some members of the aforementioned groups usually fall within the broader category of professional psychology. In Canada and the U.S., practitioners earn bachelor's and doctoral degrees; doctoral students in clinical psychology typically complete a 1-year predoctoral internship and a 1-year postdoctoral internship. In Mexico and most other Latin American and European countries, psychologists do not earn bachelor's and doctoral degrees; instead, they complete a three-year professional course after high school. Clinical psychology is at present the largest specialization within psychology. It includes the study and application of psychology for understanding, preventing, and relieving psychological distress, dysfunction, and/or mental illness. Clinical psychologists also try to promote subjective well-being and personal growth. Central to the practice of clinical psychology are psychological assessment and psychotherapy, although clinical psychologists may also engage in research, teaching, consultation, forensic testimony, and program development and administration.

Credit for the first psychology clinic in the United States typically goes to Lightner Witmer, who established his practice in Philadelphia in 1896. Another modern psychotherapist was Morton Prince, an early advocate for establishing psychology as a clinical and academic discipline. In the first part of the twentieth century, most mental health care in the United States was performed by psychiatrists, who are medical doctors. Psychology entered the field with its refinements of mental testing, which promised to improve the diagnosis of mental problems. For their part, some psychiatrists became interested in using psychoanalysis and other forms of psychodynamic psychotherapy to understand and treat the mentally ill.

Psychotherapy, as conducted by psychiatrists, blurred the distinction between psychiatry and psychology, and this trend continued with the rise of community mental health facilities. Some in the clinical psychology community adopted behavioral therapy, a thoroughly non-psychodynamic model that used behaviorist learning theory to change patients' behavior. A key aspect of behavior therapy is empirical evaluation of the treatment's effectiveness. In the 1970s, cognitive behavioral therapy emerged with the work of Albert Ellis and Aaron Beck. Although there are similarities between behavior therapy and cognitive-behavior therapy, cognitive-behavior therapy requires the application of cognitive constructs. Since the 1970s, the popularity of cognitive-behavior therapy among clinical psychologists has increased. A key practice in behavioral and cognitive behavioral therapy is exposing patients to things they fear, based on the premise that their responses (fear, panic, anxiety) can be deconditioned.

Mental health care today involves psychologists and social workers in increasing numbers. In 1977, National Institute of Mental Health director Bertram Brown described this shift as a source of "intense competition and role confusion". Graduate programs issuing doctorates in clinical psychology emerged in the 1950s and underwent a rapid increase through the 1980s. The PhD degree is intended to train practitioners who can also conduct scientific research. The PsyD degree is more exclusively designed to train practitioners.

Some clinical psychologists focus on the clinical management of patients with brain injury. This subspecialty is known as clinical neuropsychology. In many countries, clinical psychology is a regulated mental health profession. The emerging field of disaster psychology (see crisis intervention) involves professionals who respond to large-scale traumatic events.

The work performed by clinical psychologists is influenced by various therapeutic approaches, all of which involve a formal relationship between the professional and the client (usually an individual, couple, family, or small group). Typically, these approaches encourage new ways of thinking, feeling, or behaving. Four major theoretical perspectives are psychodynamic, cognitive-behavioral, existential–humanistic, and systems (or family) therapy. There has been a growing movement to integrate the various therapeutic approaches, especially with an increased understanding of issues regarding culture, gender, spirituality, and sexual orientation. With the advent of more robust research on psychotherapy, there is evidence that most major therapies are equally effective, with the key common element being a strong therapeutic alliance. Because of this, more training programs and psychologists are now adopting an eclectic therapeutic orientation.

Diagnosis in clinical psychology usually follows the Diagnostic and Statistical Manual of Mental Disorders (DSM). The study of mental illnesses is called abnormal psychology.

=== Education ===
An item from a cognitive abilities test used in educational psychology

Educational psychology is the study of how humans learn in educational settings, the effectiveness of educational interventions, the psychology of teaching, and the social psychology of schools as organizations. Educational psychologists can be found in preschools, schools of all levels, including post-secondary institutions, community organizations and learning centers, Government or private research firms, and independent or private consultants. The work of developmental psychologists such as Lev Vygotsky, Jean Piaget, and Jerome Bruner has been influential in creating teaching methods and educational practices. Educational psychology is often included in teacher education programs in North America, Australia, and New Zealand.

School psychology combines principles from educational psychology and clinical psychology to understand and treat students with learning disabilities; to foster the intellectual growth of gifted students; to facilitate prosocial behaviors in adolescents; and otherwise to promote safe, supportive, and effective learning environments. School psychologists are trained in educational and behavioral assessment, intervention, prevention, and consultation, and many have extensive training in research.

=== Work ===
Industrial and organizational (I/O) psychology involves research and practice that apply psychological theories and principles to the work lives of individuals and organizations. In the field's beginnings, industrialists brought the nascent field of psychology to bear on the study of scientific management techniques for improving workplace efficiency. The field was at first called economic psychology or business psychology; later, industrial psychology, employment psychology, or psychotechnology. An influential early study examined workers at Western Electric's Hawthorne plant in Cicero, Illinois from 1924 to 1932. Western Electric experimented on factory workers to assess their responses to changes in illumination, breaks, food, and wages. The researchers came to focus on workers' responses to observation itself, and the term Hawthorne effect is now used to describe the phenomenon in which people's behavior can change when they think they are being observed. Although the Hawthorne research can be found in psychology textbooks, the research and its findings were weak at best.

The name industrial and organizational psychology emerged in the 1960s. In 1973, it became enshrined in the name of the Society for Industrial and Organizational Psychology, Division 14 of the American Psychological Association. One goal of the discipline is to optimize human potential in the workplace. Personnel psychology is a subfield of I/O psychology. Personnel psychologists apply the methods and principles of psychology to select and evaluate workers. Another subfield, organizational psychology, examines the effects of work environments and management styles on worker motivation, job satisfaction, and productivity. Most I/O psychologists work outside of academia, for private and public organizations, and as consultants. A psychology consultant working in business today might expect to provide executives with information and ideas about their industry, their target markets, and the organization of their company.

Organizational behavior (OB) is an allied field that studies human behavior within organizations. One way to differentiate I/O psychology from OB is that I/O psychologists train in university psychology departments and OB specialists in business schools.

=== Military and intelligence ===
One role for psychologists in the military has been to evaluate and counsel soldiers and other personnel. In the U.S., this function began during World War I, when Robert Yerkes established the School of Military Psychology at Fort Oglethorpe in Georgia. The school provided psychological training for military staff. Today, U.S. Army psychologists perform psychological screening, clinical psychotherapy, suicide prevention, and treatment for post-traumatic stress, as well as provide prevention-related services, for example, smoking cessation. The United States Army's Mental Health Advisory Teams implement psychological interventions to help combat troops experiencing mental problems.

Psychologists may also work on a diverse set of campaigns known broadly as psychological warfare. Psychological warfare chiefly involves the use of propaganda to influence enemy soldiers and civilians. This so-called black propaganda is designed to seem as if it originates from a source other than the Army. The CIA's MKULTRA program involved more individualized efforts at mind control, involving techniques such as hypnosis, torture, and covert involuntary administration of LSD. The U.S. military used the name Psychological Operations (PSYOP) until 2010, when these activities were reclassified as Military Information Support Operations (MISO), part of Information Operations (IO). Psychologists have sometimes been involved in assisting the interrogation and torture of suspects, staining the records of the psychologists involved.

=== Health, well-being, and social change ===
==== Social change ====
An example of psychologists' contribution to social change involves the research of Kenneth and Mamie Phipps Clark. These two African American psychologists studied segregation's adverse psychological impact on Black children. Their research findings played a role in the desegregation case Brown v. Board of Education (1954).

The impact of psychology on social change includes the discipline's broad influence on teaching and learning. Research has shown that the phonics approach to reading instruction is more effective than the "whole word" or "whole language" approach.

==== Medical applications ====
Medical facilities increasingly employ psychologists to perform various roles. One aspect of health psychology is the psychoeducation of patients: instructing them in how to follow a medical regimen. Health psychologists can also educate doctors and research patient compliance. Psychologists in the field of public health use a wide variety of interventions to influence human behavior. These range from public relations campaigns and outreach to governmental laws and policies. Psychologists study the combined effects of these tools to influence entire populations.

==== Worker health, safety, and wellbeing ====
Psychologists work with organizations to apply findings from psychological research to improve employees' health and well-being. Some work as external consultants hired by organizations to solve specific problems, whereas others are full-time employees of the organization. Applications include conducting surveys to identify issues and designing interventions to make work healthier. Some of the specific health areas include:

- Accidents and injuries: A major contribution is the concept of safety climate, which is employees' shared perceptions of the behaviors that are encouraged (e.g., wearing safety gear) and discouraged (not following safety rules) at work. Organizations with strong safety climates have fewer work accidents and injuries.
- Cardiovascular disease: Cardiovascular disease has been related to lack of job control.
- Mental health: Exposure to occupational stress is associated with mental health disorder.
- Musculoskeletal disorder: These are injuries in bones, nerves, and tendons due to overexertion and repetitive strain. They have been linked to job satisfaction and workplace stress.
- Physical health symptoms: Occupational stress has been linked to physical symptoms such as digestive distress and headache.
- Workplace violence: Violence prevention climate is related to being physically assaulted and psychologically mistreated at work.

Interventions that improve climates can help address accidents and violence. Interventions that reduce work-related stress or provide employees with tools to manage it better can help in areas where stress is a key factor.

Industrial psychology became interested in worker fatigue during World War I, when British government ministers were concerned about the impact of fatigue on workers in munitions factories but not in other types of factories. In the U.K., some interest in worker well-being emerged with the efforts of Charles Samuel Myers and his National Institute of Industrial Psychology (NIIP) during the inter-War years. In the U.S., during the mid-twentieth century, industrial psychologist Arthur Kornhauser pioneered the study of occupational mental health, linking industrial working conditions to mental health as well as the spillover of an unsatisfying job into a worker's personal life. Zickar accumulated evidence to show that "no other industrial psychologist of his era was as devoted to advocating management and labor practices that would improve the lives of working people."

==== Occupational health psychology ====
As interest in worker health expanded toward the end of the twentieth century, the field of occupational health psychology (OHP) emerged. OHP is a branch of psychology that is interdisciplinary. OHP is concerned with the health and safety of workers. OHP addresses topic areas such as the impact of occupational stressors on physical and mental health, mistreatment of workers (e.g., bullying and violence), work-family balance, the impact of involuntary unemployment on physical and mental health, the influence of psychosocial factors on safety and accidents, and interventions designed to improve/protect worker health. OHP grew out of health psychology, industrial and organizational psychology, and occupational medicine. OHP has also been informed by disciplines outside psychology, including industrial engineering, sociology, and economics.

== Research methods ==
Quantitative psychological research lends itself to statistical hypothesis testing. Although the field makes abundant use of randomized and controlled experiments in laboratory settings, such research can only assess a limited range of short-term phenomena. Some psychologists rely on less rigorously controlled, but more ecologically valid, field experiments as well. Other research psychologists rely on statistical methods to glean knowledge from population data. The statistical methods research psychologists employ include the Pearson product–moment correlation coefficient, the analysis of variance, multiple linear regression, logistic regression, structural equation modeling, and hierarchical linear modeling. The measurement and operationalization of important constructs are essential parts of these research designs.

Although this type of psychological research is much less abundant than quantitative research, some psychologists conduct qualitative research. This type of research can involve interviews, questionnaires, and first-hand observation. While hypothesis testing is rare, virtually impossible, in qualitative research, qualitative studies can be helpful in theory and hypothesis generation, interpreting seemingly contradictory quantitative findings, and understanding why some interventions fail and others succeed.

=== Controlled experiments ===
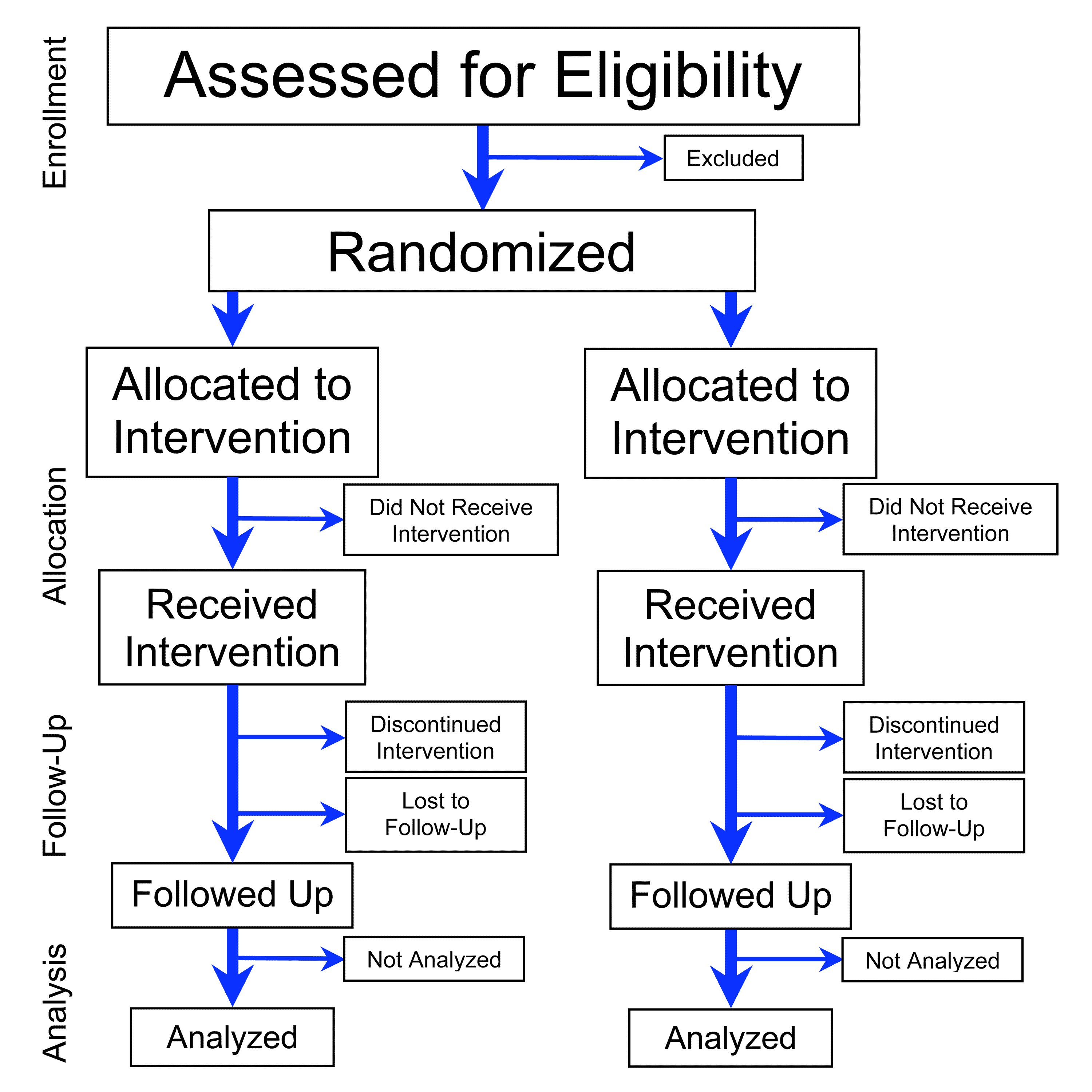
Flowchart of the four phases, enrollment, intervention allocation, follow-up, and data analysis, of a parallel randomized trial of two groups modified from the CONSORT 2010 Statement

The experimenter (E) orders the teacher (T), the subject of the experiment, to give what the latter believes are painful electric shocks to a learner (L), who is actually an actor and confederate. The subject believes that for each wrong answer, the learner received actual electric shocks, though in reality, there were no such punishments. Being separated from the subject, the confederate set up a tape recorder integrated with the electro-shock generator, which played pre-recorded sounds for each shock level etc.

A true experiment with random assignment of research participants (sometimes called subjects) to rival conditions allows researchers to make strong inferences about causal relationships. When there are large numbers of research participants, the random assignment (also called random allocation) of those participants to rival conditions ensures that the individuals in those conditions will, on average, be similar on most characteristics, including characteristics that went unmeasured. In an experiment, the researcher alters one or more variables of influence, called independent variables, and measures resulting changes in the factors of interest, called dependent variables. Prototypical experimental research is conducted in a laboratory with a carefully controlled environment.

A quasi-experiment is a situation in which different conditions are being studied, but random assignment to the different conditions is not possible. Investigators must work with preexisting groups of people. Researchers can use common sense to consider how much the nonrandom assignment threatens the study's validity. For example, in research on the best way to affect reading achievement in the first three grades of school, school administrators may not permit educational psychologists to randomly assign children to phonics and whole language classrooms, in which case the psychologists must work with preexisting classroom assignments. Psychologists will compare the achievement of children attending phonics and whole language classes and, perhaps, statistically adjust for any initial differences in reading level.

Experimental researchers typically use a statistical hypothesis testing model, which involves making predictions before experimenting and then assessing how well the collected data are consistent with those predictions. These predictions are likely to originate from one or more abstract scientific hypotheses about how the phenomenon under study actually works.

=== Other types of studies ===
Surveys are used in psychology for the purpose of measuring attitudes and traits, monitoring changes in mood, and checking the validity of experimental manipulations (checking research participants' perception of the condition they were assigned to). Psychologists have commonly used paper-and-pencil surveys. However, surveys are also conducted by phone or via e-mail. Web-based surveys are increasingly used to conveniently reach a large number of subjects.

Observational studies are commonly conducted in psychology. In cross-sectional observational studies, psychologists collect data at a single point in time. The goal of many cross-sectional studies is to assess the extent to which factors are correlated. By contrast, in longitudinal studies psychologists collect data on the same sample at two or more points in time. Sometimes the purpose of longitudinal research is to study trends across time, such as the stability of traits or age-related changes in behavior. Because some studies involve endpoints that psychologists cannot ethically study from an experimental standpoint, such as identifying the causes of depression, they conduct longitudinal studies of a large group of depression-free people, periodically assessing what is happening in the individuals' lives. In this way, psychologists have an opportunity to test causal hypotheses regarding conditions that commonly arise in people's lives that put them at risk for depression. Problems that affect longitudinal studies include selective attrition, a type of bias in which a particular type of research participant leaves a study disproportionately.

Arthur Bandura ran an example of an observational study. This observational study focused on children exposed to an adult exhibiting aggressive behavior and their reactions to toys, compared with other children not exposed to these stimuli. The result shows that children who had seen the adult acting aggressively towards a toy, in turn, were aggressive towards their own toy when put in a situation that frustrated them.

Exploratory data analysis includes a variety of practices that researchers use to reduce a large number of variables to a small number of overarching factors. In Peirce's three modes of inference, exploratory data analysis corresponds to abduction. Meta-analysis is the technique research psychologists use to integrate results from many studies of the same variables and arriving at a grand average of the findings.

=== Direct brain observation/manipulation ===
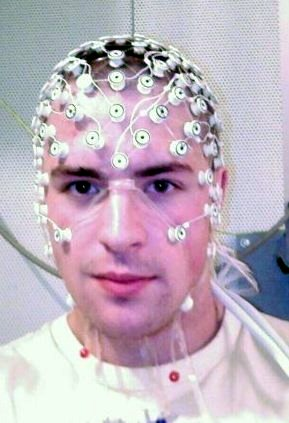
An EEG recording setup

Artificial neural network with two layers, an interconnected group of nodes, akin to the vast network of neurons in the human brain

A classic and popular tool for relating mental and neural activity is the electroencephalogram (EEG). This technique uses electrodes with amplifiers on a person's scalp to measure voltage changes across different parts of the brain. Hans Berger, the first researcher to use EEG on an unopened skull, quickly found that brains exhibit signature "brain waves": electric oscillations which correspond to different states of consciousness. Researchers subsequently refined statistical methods for synthesizing the electrode data, and identified unique brain wave patterns such as the delta wave observed during non-REM sleep.

Newer functional neuroimaging techniques include functional magnetic resonance imaging and positron emission tomography, both of which track blood flow in the brain. These technologies provide more localized information about brain activity and create brain representations with widespread appeal. They also provide insight that avoids the classic problems of subjective self-reporting. It remains challenging to draw hard conclusions about where in the brain specific thoughts originate—or even how usefully such localization corresponds with reality. However, neuroimaging has yielded unmistakable results demonstrating correlations between mind and brain. Some of these draw on a systemic neural network model rather than a localized function model.

Interventions such as transcranial magnetic stimulation and drugs also provide information about brain–mind interactions. Psychopharmacology is the study of drug-induced mental effects.

=== Computer simulation ===
Computational modeling is a tool used in mathematical psychology and cognitive psychology to simulate behavior. This method has several advantages. Since modern computers process information quickly, simulations can be run in a short time, allowing for high statistical power. Modeling also allows psychologists to visualize hypotheses about the functional organization of mental events that cannot be directly observed in humans. Computational neuroscience uses mathematical models to simulate the brain. Another method is symbolic modeling, which represents many mental objects using variables and rules. Other types of modeling include dynamic systems and stochastic modeling.

=== Animal studies ===
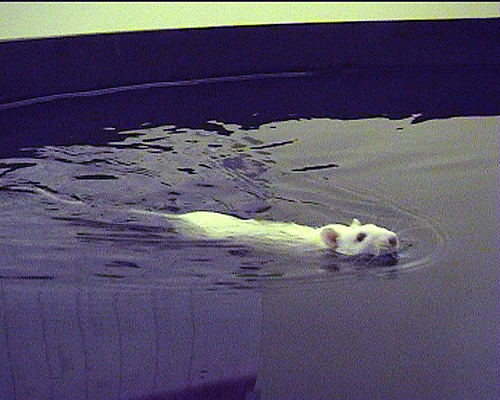
A rat undergoing a Morris water navigation test used in behavioral neuroscience to study the role of the hippocampus in spatial learning and memory

Animal experiments aid in investigating many aspects of human psychology, including perception, emotion, learning, memory, and thought. In the 1890s, Russian physiologist Ivan Pavlov famously used dogs to demonstrate classical conditioning. Non-human primates, cats, dogs, pigeons, rats, and other rodents are often used in psychological experiments. Ideally, controlled experiments introduce only one independent variable at a time to ascertain its unique effects on dependent variables. These conditions are approximated best in laboratory settings. In contrast, human environments and genetic backgrounds vary so widely and depend on so many factors that it is difficult to control important variables in human subjects. There are, however, pitfalls in generalizing findings from animal studies to humans.

Comparative psychology is the scientific study of the behavior and mental processes of non-human animals, especially as these relate to the phylogenetic history, adaptive significance, and development of behavior. Research in this area explores the behavior of many species, from insects to primates. It is closely related to other disciplines that study animal behavior, such as ethology. Research in comparative psychology sometimes appears to shed light on human behavior, but some attempts to connect the two have been quite controversial, for example, the Sociobiology of E.O. Wilson. Animal models are often used to study neural processes related to human behavior, e.g., in cognitive neuroscience.

=== Qualitative research ===
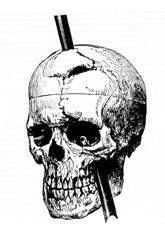
Phineas P. Gage survived an accident in which a large iron rod was driven completely through his head, destroying much of his brain's left frontal lobe, but the injury altered his personality and behavior.

Qualitative research is often designed to answer questions about individuals' thoughts, feelings, and behaviors. Qualitative research involving first-hand observation can help describe events as they occur, aiming to capture the richness of everyday behavior and to discover and understand phenomena that might have been missed in more cursory examinations.

Qualitative psychological research methods include interviews, first-hand observation, and participant observation. Creswell (2003) identified five main possibilities for qualitative research, including narrative, phenomenology, ethnography, case study, and grounded theory. Qualitative researchers sometimes aim to enrich our understanding of symbols, subjective experiences, or social structures. Sometimes hermeneutic and critical aims can give rise to quantitative research, as in Erich Fromm's application of psychological and sociological theories, in his book Escape from Freedom, to understanding why many ordinary Germans supported Hitler.

Just as Jane Goodall studied chimpanzee social and family life by careful observation of chimpanzee behavior in the field, psychologists conduct naturalistic observation of ongoing human social, professional, and family life. Sometimes participants are aware they are being observed; other times, they are not. Strict ethical guidelines must be followed when covert observation is being carried out.

=== Program evaluation ===
Program evaluation involves the systematic collection, analysis, and application of information to answer questions about projects, policies, and programs, particularly about their effectiveness. In both the public and private sectors, stakeholders often want to know the extent to which the programs they are funding, implementing, voting for, receiving, or objecting to are producing the intended effects. While program evaluation first focuses on effectiveness, important considerations often include the program's cost per participant, how it could be improved, whether it is worthwhile, whether there are better alternatives, whether there are unintended outcomes, and whether the program's goals are appropriate and useful.

== Contemporary issues ==
=== Metascience ===
Metascience involves applying scientific methodology to study science itself. The field of metascience has revealed problems in psychological research. Some psychological research has suffered from bias, problematic reproducibility, and misuse of statistics. These findings have led to calls for reform from within and from outside the scientific community.

==== Confirmation bias ====
In 1959, statistician Theodore Sterling examined the results of psychological studies and found that 97% supported their initial hypotheses, suggesting possible publication bias. Similarly, Fanelli (2010) found that 91.5% of psychiatry/psychology studies confirmed the effects they were looking for, and concluded that the odds of this happening (a positive result) was around five times higher than in fields such as space science or geosciences. Fanelli argued that this is because researchers in "softer" sciences have fewer constraints on their conscious and unconscious biases.

==== Replication ====
An apparent replication crisis in social psychology has been observed; many notable findings in the field have not or could not be replicated. The possibility of researcher malfeasance as manifest by publishing fraudulent results has been considered as a root cause. Systematic efforts, including those by the Reproducibility Project of the Center for Open Science, to assess the extent of the problem found that as many as two-thirds of highly publicized findings in psychology failed to replicate.

Reproducibility has generally been stronger in cognitive psychology (in studies and journals) than social psychology and subfields of differential psychology. Other subfields of psychology have also been implicated in the replication crisis, including clinical psychology, developmental psychology, and a field closely related to psychology, educational research.

The focus on the replication crisis has led to other renewed efforts in the discipline to retest important findings. In response to concerns about publication bias and data dredging (conducting a large number of statistical tests on a great many variables but restricting reporting to the results that were statistically significant), 295 psychology and medical journals have adopted result-blind peer review where studies are accepted not on the basis of their findings and after the studies are completed, but before the studies are conducted and upon the basis of the methodological rigor of their experimental designs and the theoretical justifications for their proposed statistical analysis before data collection or analysis is conducted. In addition, large-scale collaborations among researchers working in multiple labs in different countries have taken place. The collaborators regularly make their data openly available for different researchers to assess. Allen and Mehler estimated that 61 percent of result-blind studies have yielded null results, in contrast to an estimated 5 to 20 percent in traditional research.

==== Misuse of statistics ====
Some critics view statistical hypothesis testing as misplaced. Psychologist and statistician Jacob Cohen wrote in 1994 that psychologists routinely confuse statistical significance with practical importance, enthusiastically reporting great certainty in unimportant facts. Some psychologists have responded with an increased use of effect size statistics, rather than sole reliance on p-values.

=== WEIRD bias ===
In 2008, Arnett pointed out that most articles in American Psychological Association journals focused on the U.S. population, even though U.S. citizens make up only 5% of the world's population. He complained that psychologists had no basis for assuming that psychological processes are universal and for generalizing research findings to the rest of the global population. In 2010, Henrich, Heine, and Norenzayan reported a bias in conducting psychology studies with participants from "WEIRD" ("Western, Educated, Industrialized, Rich, and Democratic") societies. Henrich et al. found that "96% of psychological samples come from countries with only 12% of the world's population" (p. 63). The article gave examples of results that differ significantly between people from WEIRD and tribal cultures, including the Müller-Lyer illusion. Arnett (2008), Altmaier, and Hall (2008) and Morgan-Consoli et al. (2018) view the Western bias in research and theory as a serious problem, considering psychologists are increasingly applying psychological principles developed in WEIRD regions in their research, clinical work, and consultation with populations around the world. In 2018, Rad, Martingano, and Ginges showed that nearly a decade after Henrich et al.'s paper, over 80% of the samples used in studies published in the journal Psychological Science employed WEIRD samples. Moreover, their analysis showed that several studies did not fully disclose the origin of their samples; the authors offered a set of recommendations to editors and reviewers to reduce WEIRD bias.

=== STRANGE bias ===
Similar to the WEIRD bias, starting in 2020, researchers of non-human behavior have started to emphasize the need to document the possibility of the STRANGE (Social background, Trappability and self-selection, Rearing history, Acclimation and habituation, Natural changes in responsiveness, Genetic makeup, and Experience) bias in study conclusions.

=== Unscientific mental health training ===
Some observers perceive a gap between scientific theory and its application—in particular, the application of unsupported or unsound clinical practices. Critics say there has been an increase in the number of mental health training programs that do not instill scientific competence. Practices such as "facilitated communication for infantile autism"; memory-recovery techniques including body work; and other therapies, such as rebirthing and reparenting, may be dubious or even dangerous, despite their popularity. These practices, however, are outside the mainstream practices taught in clinical psychology doctoral programs.

== Ethics ==
Ethical standards in the discipline have changed over time. Some famous past studies are today considered unethical and in violation of established codes (e.g., the Canadian Code of Conduct for Research Involving Humans, and the Belmont Report). The American Psychological Association has advanced a set of ethical principles and a code of conduct for the profession.

The most important contemporary standards include informed and voluntary consent. After World War II, the Nuremberg Code was established because of Nazi abuses of experimental subjects. Later, most countries (and scientific journals) adopted the Declaration of Helsinki. In the U.S., the National Institutes of Health established the Institutional Review Board in 1966 and, in 1974, adopted the National Research Act (HR 7724). All of these measures encouraged researchers to obtain informed consent from human participants in experimental studies. Many influential but ethically dubious studies led to the establishment of this rule; such studies included the MIT-Harvard Fernald School radioisotope studies, the Thalidomide scandal, the Willowbrook hepatitis study, Stanley Milgram's studies of obedience to authority, and the Stanford Prison Experiment.

=== Ethics with Humans ===
The ethics code of the American Psychological Association originated in 1951 as "Ethical Standards of Psychologists". This code has guided the formation of licensing laws in most American states. It has changed multiple times over the decades since its adoption, and contains both aspirational principles and binding ethical standards.

The APA's Ethical Principles of Psychologists and Code of Conduct consists of five General Principles, which are meant to guide psychologists to higher ethical practice where a particular standard does not apply. Those principles are:

A. Beneficence and Nonmaleficence - meaning the psychologists must work to benefit those they work with and "do no harm." This includes awareness of indirect benefits and harms their work might have on others due to personal, social, political, or other factors.

B. Fidelity and Responsibility - an awareness of public trust in the profession and adherence to ethical standards and clarification of roles to preserve that trust. This includes managing conflicts of interest and committing a portion of a psychologist's professional time to low-cost or pro bono work.

C. Integrity - upholding honesty and accuracy in all psychological practices, including avoiding misrepresentations and fraud. In situations where psychologists would use deception (e.g., in certain research), they must consider the necessity, benefits, and harms and mitigate any harms where possible.

D. Justice - an understanding that psychology must be for everyone's benefit, and that psychologists take special care to avoid unjust practices as a result of biases or limitations of expertise.

E. Respect for People's Rights and Dignity - the preservation of people's rights when working with psychologists, including confidentially, privacy, and autonomy. Psychologists should consider a multitude of factors, including a need for special safeguards for protected populations (e.g., minors, incarcerated individuals) and awareness of differences based on numerous factors, including culture, race, age, gender, and socioeconomic status.

In 1989, the APA revised its policies on advertising and referral fees to negotiate the end of an investigation by the Federal Trade Commission. The 1992 incarnation was the first to distinguish between "aspirational" and "enforceable" ethical standards. The APA code was further revised in 2010 to prevent the use of the code to justify violating human rights, which was in response to the participation of APA members in interrogations under the administration of United States President George W. Bush. Members of the public have a five-year window to file ethics complaints about APA members with the APA ethics committee; members of the APA have a three-year window.

The Canadian Psychological Association used the APA code until 1986, when it developed its own code drawing from four similar principles: 1) Respect for the Dignity of Persons and Peoples, 2) Responsible Caring, 3) Integrity in Relationships, 4) Responsibility to Society. The European Federation of Psychologists' Associations has adopted a model code using the principles of the Canadian Code, while also drawing from the APA code.

Universities have ethics committees dedicated to protecting the rights (e.g., voluntary nature of participation in the research, privacy) and well-being (e.g., minimizing distress) of research participants. University ethics committees evaluate proposed research to ensure that researchers protect the rights and well-being of participants; an investigator's research project cannot be conducted unless approved by such an ethics committee.

The field of psychology also identifies certain categories of people that require additional or special protection due to particular vulnerabilities, unequal power dynamics, or diminished capacity for informed consent. This list often includes, but is not limited to, children, incarcerated individuals, pregnant women, human fetuses and neonates, institutionalized persons, those with physical or mental disabilities, and the educationally or economically disadvantaged.

Some of the most important ethical issues are the requirement to practice only within the area of competence, to maintain confidentiality with the patients, and to avoid sexual relations with them. Another important principle is informed consent, the idea that a patient or research subject must understand and freely choose to undergo a procedure. Some of the most common complaints against clinical psychologists include sexual misconduct and breaches in confidentiality or privacy.

Psychology ethics apply to all types of human contact in a psychologist's professional capacity, including therapy, assessment, teaching, training, work with research subjects, testimony in courts and before government bodies, consulting, and statements to the public or media about matters of psychology.

=== Ethics with other animals ===
University ethics committees govern research on other animals. Research on nonhuman animals cannot proceed without the ethics committee's permission from the researcher's home institution. Ethical guidelines state that using non-human animals for scientific purposes is only acceptable when the harm (physical or psychological) done to animals is outweighed by the benefits of the research. Psychologists can use certain research techniques on animals that could not be used on humans.

Comparative psychologist Harry Harlow drew moral condemnation for isolation experiments on rhesus macaque monkeys at the University of Wisconsin–Madison in the 1970s. The research aimed to produce an animal model of clinical depression. Harlow also devised what he called a "rape rack", to which the female isolates were tied in a normal monkey mating posture. In 1974, American literary critic Wayne C. Booth wrote that, "Harry Harlow and his colleagues go on torturing their nonhuman primates decade after decade, invariably proving what we all knew in advance—that social creatures can be destroyed by destroying their social ties." He writes that Harlow made no mention of the criticism of the morality of his work.

Animal research is influential in psychology, though it remains a subject of debate among academics. The testing of animals for research has led to medical breakthroughs in human medicine. Many psychologists argue that animal experimentation is essential for human advancement, but the government must regulate it to ensure ethicality.

== See also ==
- Behavior
- Anthropology
- Sociology
- Neurochemistry
- Neurology
- Pharmacology
- Psychoanalysis
- Neurodiversity
- Therapy
