= Robert A. Emmons =

American psychologist

- Born: born June 12, 1958
- Occupation: psychologist
- Title: Professor

Robert A. Emmons (born June 12, 1958) is an American psychologist and professor at UC Davis (Davis, California). His research is in the field of personality psychology, emotion psychology, and psychology of religion.

== Background ==
Emmons completed his undergraduate psychology degree in 1980 at the University of Southern Maine, Portland. He then obtained a M.A. in 1984 from the University of Illinois at Urbana-Champaign in personality psychology, and a Ph.D., in the same subject from the same university in 1986, with a thesis "Personal Strivings: An Approach to Personality and Subjective Well-Being". He was an assistant professor at Michigan State University from 1986 to 1988 and came to Davis at the same rank in 1988. He was appointed associate professor in 1990, and full professor in 1996. He has written or edited 6 books and over 100 articles for scientific journals. He is editor-in-chief of The Journal of Positive Psychology.

== Research ==
Emmons' research examines the psychology of gratitude and the psychology of individual goal setting and their connection with positive outcomes in a person's life. He was involved in a $905,000 research grant from the Templeton Foundation during 2006–2009 evaluating the effect of Young Life (a Christian youth ministry) on teens' spiritual fruits such as kindness, generosity, and selflessness, and has received other grants from them. Emmons is known for working on multiple research projects focused on gratitude.

He addresses many ways to stay grateful in different situations and has found through his research that gratefulness inspires happiness. He is focused on finding ways to engender gratefulness in youth. He has found that practicing acts of gratitude such as journaling things for which one is grateful for can promote well-being.

== Bibliography ==
=== Books written ===
- Emmons, R.A. (2016). The Little Book of Gratitude: Create a Life of Happiness and Well-Being By Giving Thanks. London: Gaia. 2016 ISBN 9781856753654
- Emmons, Robert A. (2013) Gratitude Works!: A Twenty-One-Day Program for Creating Emotional Prosperity. San Francisco : Jossey-Bass, 2013 SBN 9781118131299
- Emmons, R.A. (2007). THANKS! How the New Science of Gratitude Can Make You Happier. Boston, MA: Houghton-Mifflin. ISBN 9780618620197 (reprinted in paperback titled THANKS! How Practicing Gratitude Can Make You Happier New York: Mariner Books, 2008 ISBN 9780547085739).
  - Translated into French as Merci ! : quand la gratitude change nos vies, Turkish as Teşekkür ederim, and Chinese as 愈感恩, 愈富足 /Yu gan en, yu fu zu
- Emmons, R.A. & Hill, J. (2001). Words of gratitude for mind, body, and soul. Radnor, PA: Templeton Foundation Press.
- Emmons, R.A. (1999). The psychology of ultimate concerns: Motivation and spirituality in personality. New York: The Guilford Press.ISBN 9781572304567

=== Books edited ===
- Emmons, R.A., & McCullough, M.E. (Eds.). (2004) The psychology of gratitude. New York: Oxford University Press. ISBN 978-0195348729
- Rabin, A.I., Zucker, R.A., Emmons, R.A., & Frank, S. (Eds.). (1990). Studying persons and lives. New York: Springer Publishing Company.
