= Gratitude journal =

Practice in positive psychology

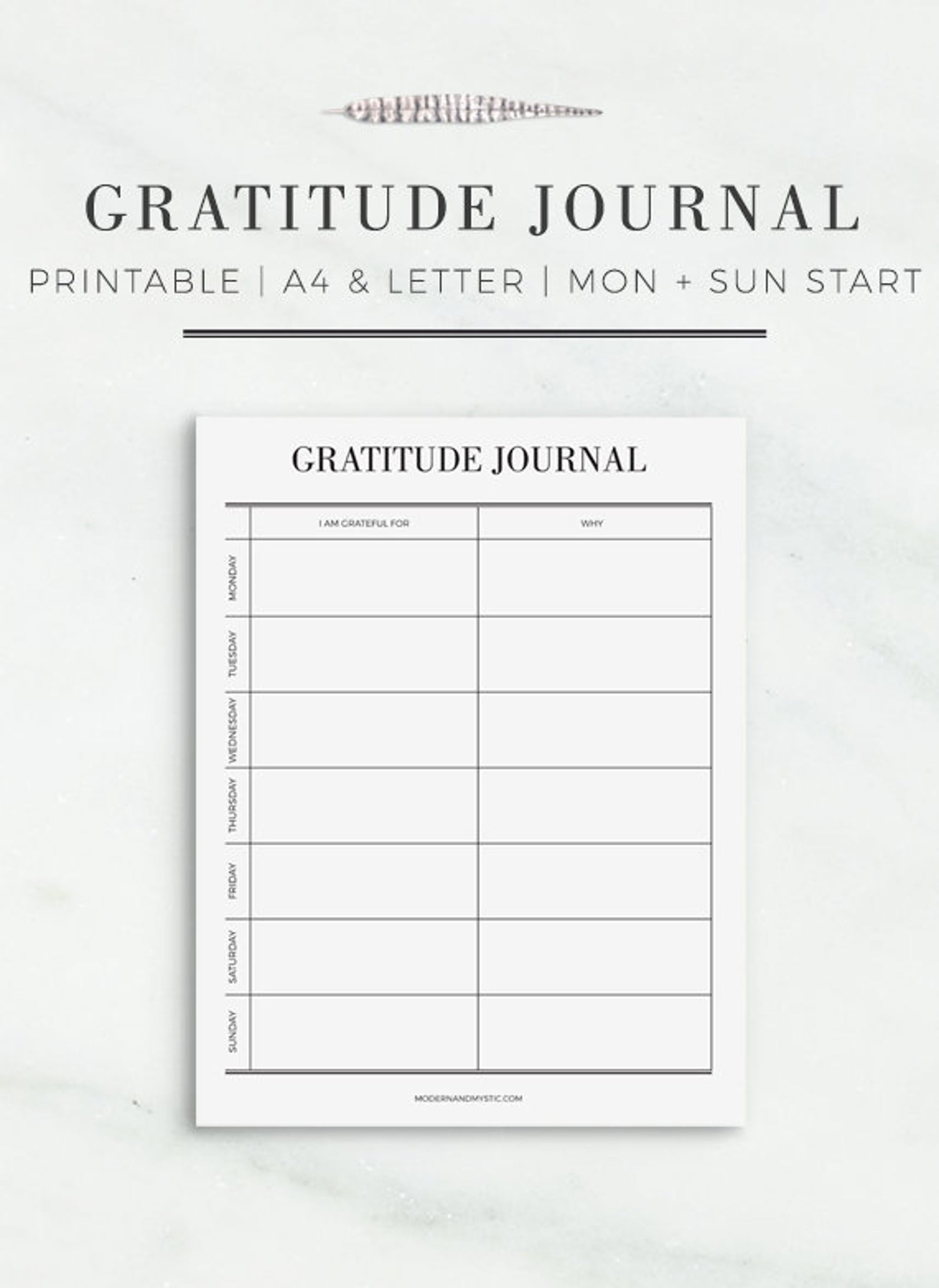
A gratitude journal

A gratitude journal is a diary of things for which someone is grateful. Keeping a gratitude journal is a popular practice in the field of positive psychology. It is also referred to as “counting one's blessings” or “three good things”.

Empirical findings on the benefits of gratitude journals have shown significant impact on psychological and physical well-being. Early research revealed individuals who regularly documented things they were grateful for, experienced heightened optimism, increased exercise time, fewer physical symptoms, and greater progress towards goals. Such benefits were observed in adults with neuromuscular diseases, noting improved optimism, sleep quality, and connection to others. Studies extended to childhood, where gratitude practices enhanced life satisfaction and school satisfaction among early adolescents.

Further research highlighted gratitude's neural correlates, particularly in the medial prefrontal cortex, linking directly to participants' gratitude levels. Comparative studies on happiness interventions ranked gratitude journals highly for their accessibility and impact on happiness. Exploration into the content of journals found entries prompting deeper reflection on gratitude's cause significantly enhanced happiness and well-being. The debate continues regarding optimal frequency of gratitude journaling for maintaining its psychological benefits, with some evidence favoring weekly over daily journaling. Most studies concurred that 3-10 items per journal entry strikes the best balance between fostering gratitude, and avoiding potential boredom.

== Major empirical findings ==
Early research studies on gratitude journals by Emmons & McCullough found "counting one's blessings" in a journal led to improved psychological and physical functioning. Participants who recorded weekly journals, each consisting of five things they were grateful for, were more optimistic towards the upcoming week and life as a whole, spent more time exercising, and had fewer symptoms of physical illness. Participants who kept daily gratitude journals reported increased overall gratitude, positive affect, enthusiasm, determination, and alertness. They were also more likely to help others and make progress towards their personal goals, compared to those who did not keep gratitude journals. For a sample of adults with neuromuscular disease, writing daily gratitude journals for 3 weeks lead to increased optimism about one's life, longer and more refreshing sleep, greater positive emotions, and feeling more connected to others. Overall, participants who kept weekly or daily gratitude journals had greater psychological and physical benefits when compared to participants who did not keep gratitude journals.

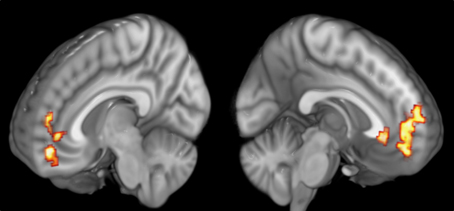
Neural correlates of gratitude. Medial Prefrontal activity correlating with participants' gratitude ratings.

Furthermore, the positive effects of gratitude can begin as early as childhood. A study conducted by Froh, Sefick, and Emmons in 2008 examined the effects of a grateful outlook on the subjective well being of 221 early adolescents in sixth and seventh grade. The children were asked to “count their blessings” and set aside time daily to list what they were thankful for. Results found that counting one's blessings was associated with enhanced self-reported feelings of gratitude, optimism, life satisfaction, and decreased negative affect. Furthermore, exhibiting gratitude correlated to long-term satisfaction with school experience.

Another benefit may be that gratitude journals are a relatively easy and enjoyable way to boost happiness: Parks et al. found that when presented with eight different happiness interventions, gratitude journals were the third most popular (preceded by “Goal evaluation and tracking” and “Savoring the moment”). Similarly, Seligman et al. found that participants were more likely to continue their “three good things” exercise on their own after the one-week intervention than the other exercises, and this lack of attrition mediated the link between the exercise and its benefits.

== Applications ==
In light of the body of literature on the benefits of gratitude journals, researchers have investigated how to maximize these benefits. One study investigating the efficacy of a number of happiness interventions instructed participants to complete gratitude journals either once or three times per week. Results indicated that weekly gratitude journals led to a significant increase in happiness, but thrice-weekly gratitude journals did not. This study compared the gratitude intervention to a different activity in which participants completed five acts of kindness, either all in one day or spread out over the week. The results for this activity were remarkably similar to the results of the gratitude journals: those in the single-day condition reported a significant increase in well-being, while those who spread their acts of kindness across several days did not. The authors suggested that spreading out these happiness-boosting activities—gratitude or kindness—may have diminished their saliency or their novelty. These results suggest that a once-weekly gratitude journal is most beneficial.

Seligman et al. examined the effects of a similar intervention over a longer period of time. Participants were instructed to write down “three good things” that happened at the end of each day, in addition to a causal explanation for each good thing. After completing this activity every day for a week, participants began to report more happiness and less depression after one month, an effect that remained at three- and six-month follow-ups. The beneficial effects of the “three good things” exercise lasted longer than effects of other week-long interventions (writing about yourself at your best, identifying signature strengths, and delivering a letter of gratitude) and results suggest that gratitude journals may have a greater long-term impact than other happiness interventions. However, the long-term benefits of weekly versus daily gratitude journaling remains unclear.

=== Examples ===
Some research has found that gratitude journal entries that address and answer the questions “Why am I grateful for this? Why did this good thing happen?” are exceptionally beneficial because they cause the individual to think about and recognize their gratitude and its cause. Some studies have had participants use a template for writing in their journal entry. Following the “I am grateful for ___________, because ________________” template has been shown to result in increased happiness and subjective well being. Having deeper, more personal things to be grateful for yields greater happiness and increased gratitude.

== Questions around greatest effectiveness ==
Researchers disagree as to whether it is more beneficial to keep a weekly or daily gratitude journal. Some studies suggest daily gratitude journals produce larger increases in overall gratitude levels than weekly journals. However, other researchers believe that weekly journaling is best, because people can adapt to the effects of daily journaling too quickly and lose the most beneficial effects of gratitude journals. One study found that people who kept weekly journals had benefits greater than those who kept daily journals, while another study found that weekly gratitude journals resulted in higher levels of happiness than thrice-weekly gratitude journaling. While certain effects may differ slightly for weekly and daily gratitude journals, both have proven to be beneficial for psychological well-being.

Most studies investigating gratitude journals have found that including 3-10 items, in each journal entry, yields the most beneficial results. While the majority of research has participants only write 3 things in their journal per entry, some studies have found that even writing 10 items per entry yields positive results for the author. However, researchers suggest that writing too many items per entry (above 10) will actually not yield the typical psychological benefits of a gratitude journal. With a higher number of items to record, the task of writing in a gratitude journal can become too tedious for individuals to comply with. Psychologist Robert Emmons believes humans adapt to positive changes quickly, and too many and too frequent gratitude journal entries, will not have the same beneficial effects as shorter, less frequent entries. Including more than 10 items may even take away the salience of recognizing what there is to be grateful for in daily life.

== See also ==
- Paradox of hedonism
