= Gratitude =

Feeling or attitude in acknowledgement of a benefit that one has received or will receive

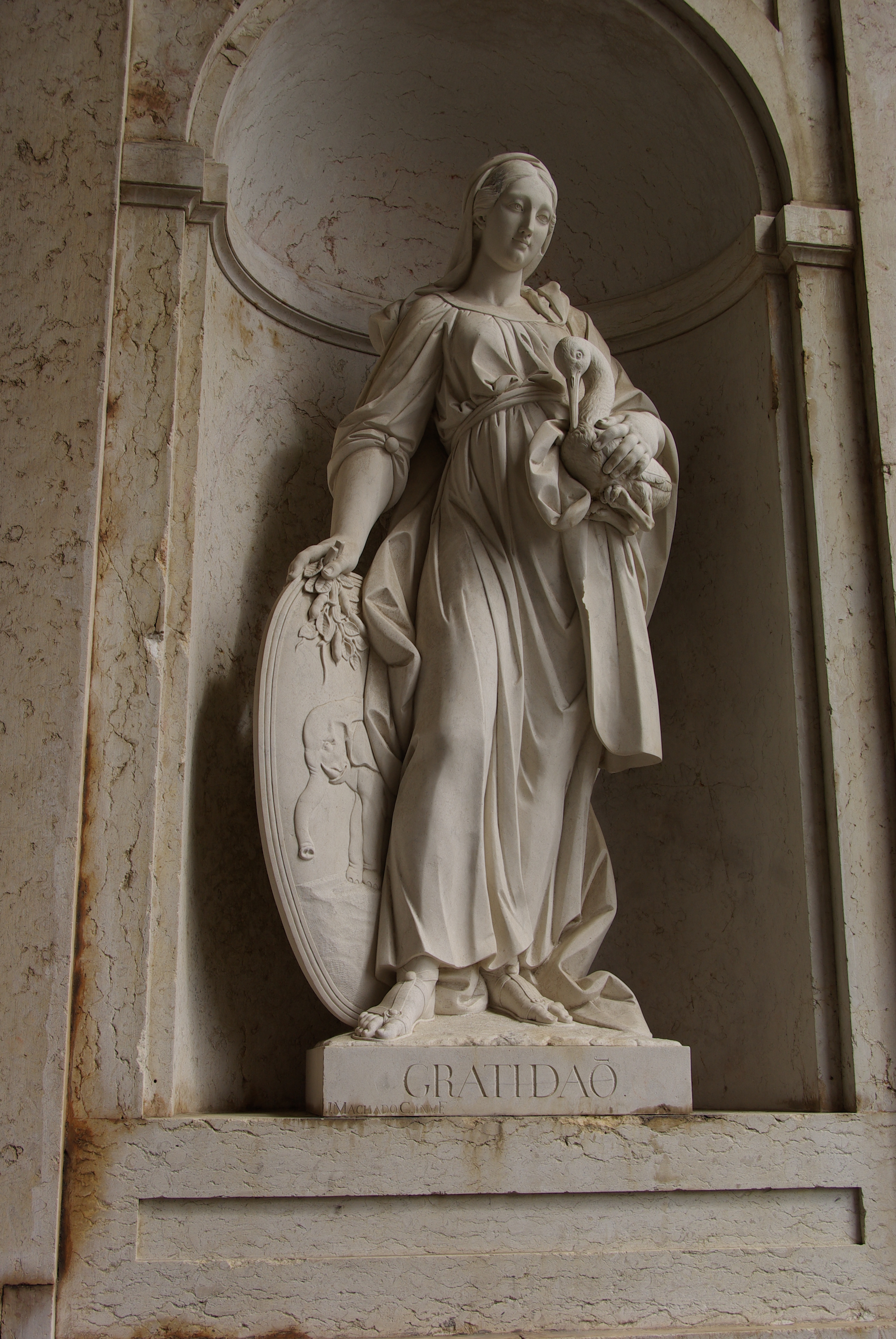
Gratitude. Statue in Palácio Nacional da Ajuda.

Gratitude, thankfulness, or gratefulness is a feeling of appreciation (or similar positive response) by a recipient in response to another person's kindness. This kindness can be gifts, help, favors, or another form of generosity to another person.

The word comes from the Latin word gratus, which means "pleasing" or "thankful". The absence of gratitude where gratitude is expected is called ingratitude or ungratefulness.

Gratitude has been a fundamental part of several world religions. It also has been a topic of interest to ancient, medieval, and modern philosophers.

The discipline of psychology attempts to understand the short term experience of gratitude (state gratitude), individual differences in how frequently gratitude is felt (trait gratitude), the relationship between these two, and the therapeutic benefits of gratitude.

Researchers in the discipline of communication, particularly positive communication scholarship, have studied gratitude and recognize that showing appreciation in the workplace is a communicative behavior. One systematic review describes gratitude research in communication and other social sciences as relatively new and siloed compared with gratitude research in psychology.

== Philosophical approaches ==
Gratitude is a topic of interest in the philosophical disciplines of normative ethics, applied ethics, and political philosophy, as well as in the field of moral psychology. Abraham Maslow said that the hallmark of a mature person is "the ability to appreciate again and again, freshly and naively, the basic goods of life with awe, pleasure, wonder and even ecstasy."

A. D. M. Walker suggests, contrary to views that only characterize gratitude as a kind of reciprocity, that gratitude is appropriate even toward an unintentional kindness, such as an offhand remark from a stranger. Walker further observes that Thomas Aquinas commended gratefulness for what benefits one even when done from contempt, reluctance and regret.

== Religious approaches ==
Spirituality and gratitude are not dependent on each other, but studies have found that spirituality can enhance a person's ability to be grateful. Those who regularly attend religious services or engage in religious activities are more likely to have a greater sense of gratitude in all areas of life. Gratitude is prized in the Christian, Buddhist, Muslim, Jewish, Baháʼí, and Hindu traditions. Worship with gratitude to God, or a similar religious figure, is a common theme in such religions, and the concept of gratitude permeates religious texts, teachings, and traditions. It is one of the most common emotions that religions aim to evoke and maintain in followers and is regarded as a universal religious sentiment.

=== Jewish conceptions ===
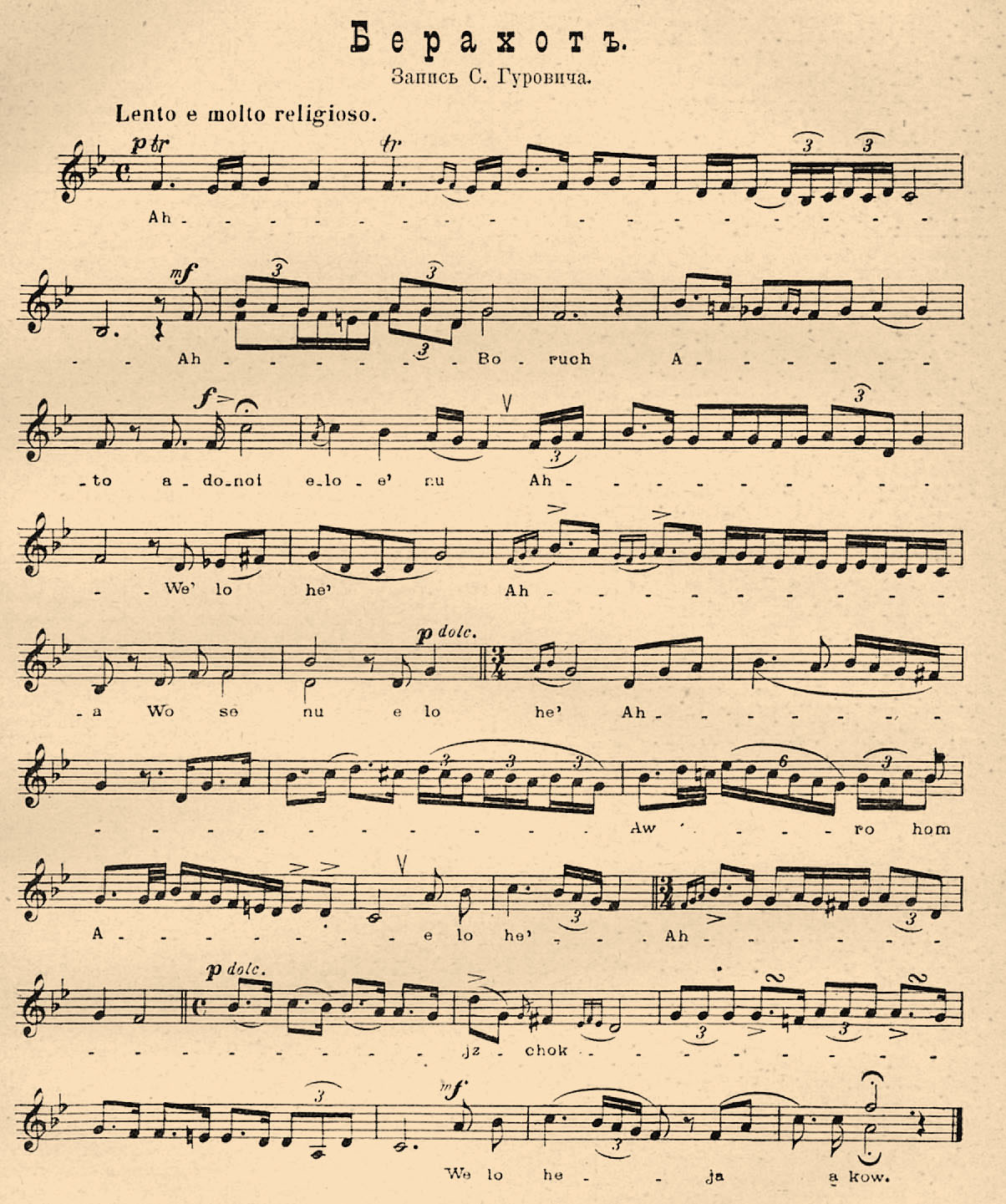
Berachot — thanksgiving and praise prayers. Illustration from the Jewish Encyclopedia of Brockhaus and Efron (1906–1913).

In Judaism, gratitude is an essential part of the act of worship and every aspect of a worshipper's life. According to the Hebrew worldview, all things come from God and, due to this, gratitude is essential to the followers of Judaism.

The Hebrew Scriptures are filled with the idea of gratitude. Two examples in the Psalms are "O Lord my God, I will give thanks to you forever", and "I will give thanks to the Lord with my whole heart." Jewish prayers often incorporate gratitude, beginning with the Shema, in which the worshipper states that out of gratitude, "You shall love the Eternal, your God, with all your heart, with all your soul, and with all your might." One of the crucial blessings in the central thrice-daily prayer, the Amidah, is called Modim – "We give thanks to You"; this is also the only blessing that is recited by the congregation together with the leader during their repetition of the Amidah. The concluding prayer, the Alenu, also speaks of gratitude by thanking God for the particular destiny of the Jewish people. Along with these prayers, faithful worshippers recite more than one hundred blessings, called berachot, throughout the day.

In Judaism there is also a significant emphasis on gratitude for acts of human kindness and goodness.

=== Christian conceptions ===
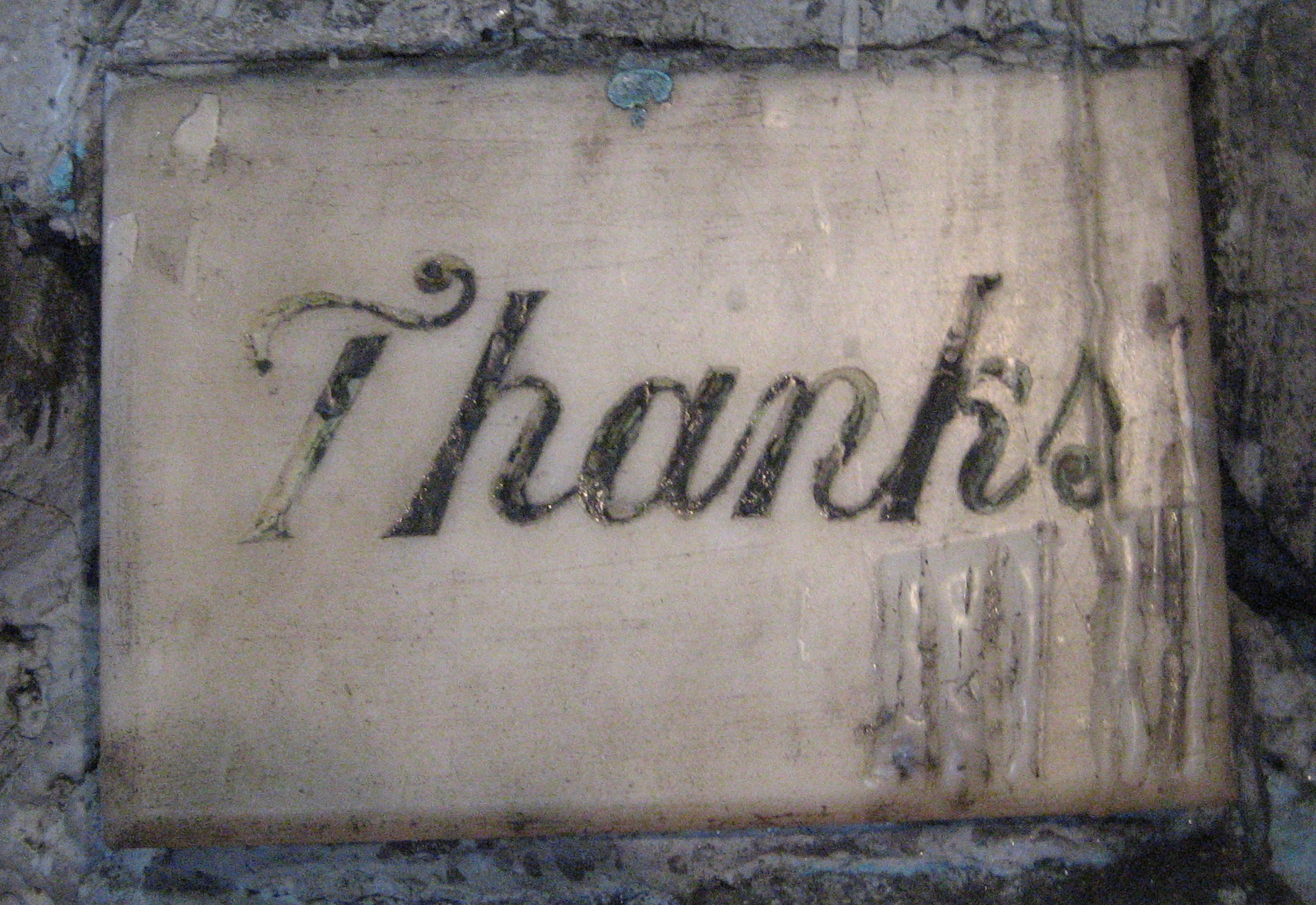
New Orleans: Thank you message in the grotto of Our Lady of Guadalupe Church; added by those for whom prayer or miracles were granted

Martin Luther referred to gratitude as "the basic Christian attitude" and today it is still referred to as "the heart of the gospel". Christians are encouraged to praise and give gratitude to their creator. In Christian gratitude, God is seen as the selfless giver of all good things and, because of this, gratefulness enables Christians to share a common bond, shaping all aspects of a follower's life. Gratitude in Christianity is an acknowledgement of God's generosity that inspires Christians to shape their own thoughts and actions around such ideals.

Not simply a sentimental feeling, Christian gratitude is a virtue that shapes not only emotions and thoughts, but also actions and deeds.

Jonathan Edwards wrote in his book A Treatise Concerning Religious Affections that gratitude and thankfulness toward God are among the signs of true religion. Allport (1950) suggested that mature religious intentions come from feelings of profound gratitude; Edwards (1746/1959) claimed that the "affection" of gratitude is one of the most accurate ways to find the presence of God in a person's life. In a small sample of Catholic nuns and priests, out of 50 emotions, love and gratitude were the most experienced emotions towards God.

Pope Francis has noted that one of the lessons generally learned in family life is learning to say "thank you" as "an expression of genuine gratitude for what we have been given".

In the Orthodox, Catholic, Lutheran, and Anglican churches, the most important rite is called the Eucharist; the name derives from the Greek word Eucharistic, meaning thanksgiving.

=== Islamic conceptions ===
The Islamic sacred text, the Quran, is filled with the idea of gratitude. Islam encourages Muslims to be grateful and to express thanks to Allah in all circumstances. Muslims commonly express their gratitude using the term "Alhamdulillah" (praise be to God), which is one of the four beloved words of Allah.

Even some verses of Quran indicates that, our main duty on this earth is to show our gratitude. For example,

Then I (satan) will come upon them from the front and from the rear, and from their right and from their left. And You will not find most of them thankful.

— (Quran 7:17)

In this verse satan is saying to Allah that He will not find most humans grateful toward Him after when he (satan) refused to prostrate Adam. And the term Kafir also means 'ungrateful' (toward God) with the most fundamental sense in Quran. Here are some other verses from Quran:

Thus We (Allah) punished them because of their ungratefulness. We do not give (such a) punishment but to the ungrateful.

— (Quran 34:17)

We (Allah) already showed them the Way, whether they ˹choose to˺ be grateful or ungrateful.

— (Quran 76:3)

Islamic teaching emphasizes that those who are grateful will be rewarded with more. A traditional Islamic saying is "The first who will be summoned to paradise are those who have praised God in every circumstance." The Quran also states, in Sura 14, that those who are grateful will be given more by Allah.

Many practices of Islam encourage gratitude. For example, the Pillar of Islam that calls for daily prayer encourages believers to pray to Allah five times a day in order to thank him for his goodness, and the pillar of fasting during the month of Ramadan is for the purpose of putting the believer in a state of gratitude.

== Individual differences in gratitude ==
Cultural and linguistic factors play a significant role in shaping expressions of gratitude worldwide. Much research into gratitude focuses on individual differences in gratitude and the consequences of being a more or less grateful person. Three scales have been developed to measure individual differences in gratitude, each of which assesses somewhat different conceptions. The GQ6 measures individual differences in how frequently and intensely people feel gratitude. The Appreciation Scale measures eight different aspects of gratitude: appreciation of people, possessions, the present moment, rituals, feelings of awe, social comparisons, existential concerns, and behavior which expresses gratitude. The GRAT assesses gratitude towards other people, gratitude towards the world in general, and a lack of resentment for what you lack. A study showed that these scales all measure the same way of approaching life; this suggests that individual differences in gratitude include all of these components.

== Empirical findings ==
=== Association with well-being ===
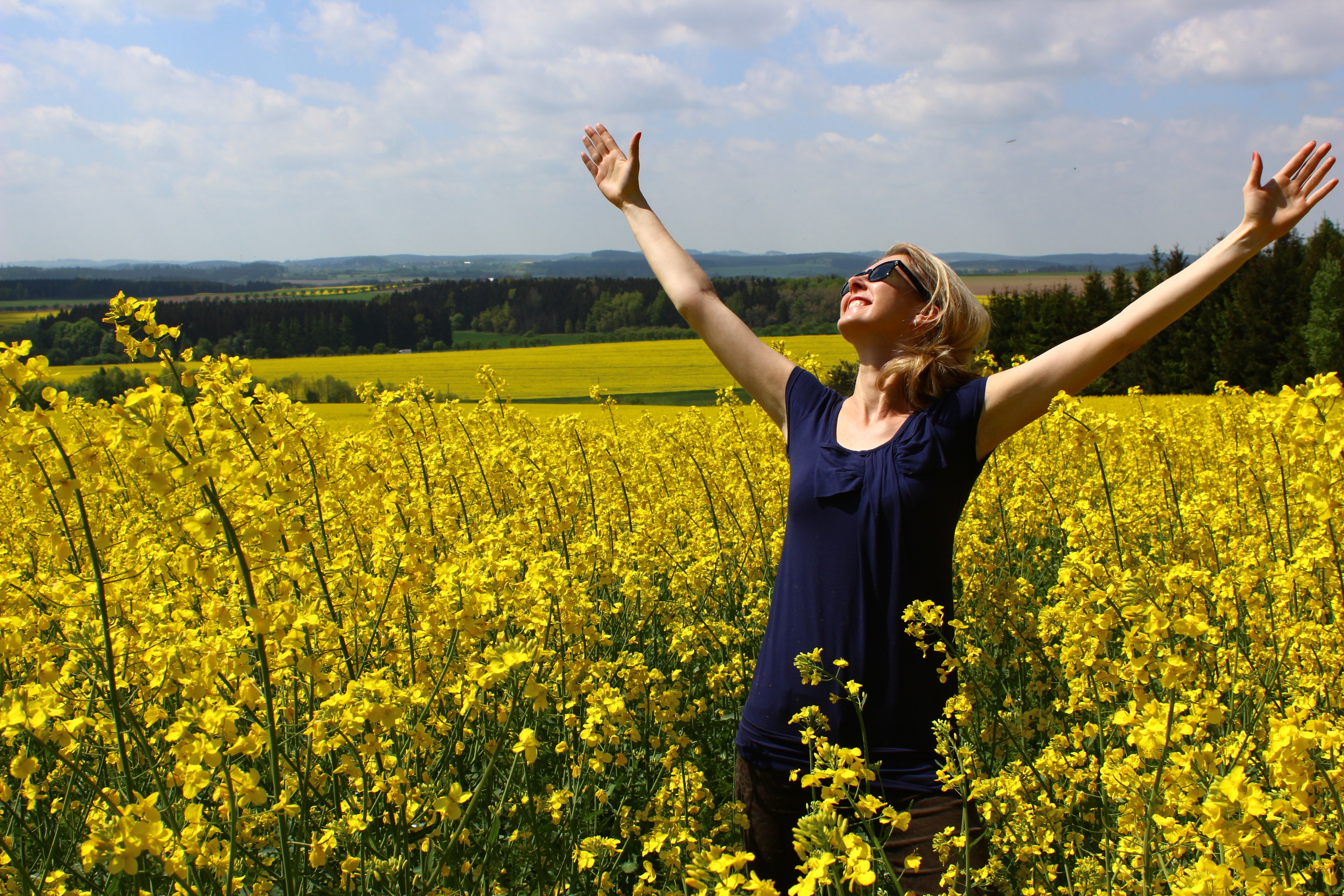
Happiness and gratitude in an open field

Gratitude not only contributes to positive emotions, but it also leads to a reduction in negative emotions. People who are more grateful have higher levels of subjective well-being. Grateful people are happier, less depressed, less stressed, and more satisfied with their lives and social relationships. Gratitude may shield against depression by enhancing the encoding and recall of positive experiences. Grateful people tend to exercise greater levels of control over their environments, experience personal growth, find purpose in life, and accept themselves. They also tend to employ more constructive coping strategies when faced with life's challenges. They are more likely to seek support from other people and to reinterpret and grow from experiences, and they spend more time planning how to deal with problems. Grateful people rely less on negative coping mechanisms, such as avoidance, self-blame, or substance use. Grateful people also sleep better, because they think more positive thoughts just before going to sleep. They tend to have better relationships, as a person's gratitude can positively impact their partner's satisfaction in the relationship. Grateful people are more likely to have higher levels of happiness and lower levels of stress and depression.

Although many emotions and personality traits are important to well-being and mental health, gratitude may be especially important. A longitudinal study showed that people who were more grateful coped better with a life transition. Specifically, people who were more grateful before the transition were less stressed, less depressed, and more satisfied with their relationships three months later. Two other studies suggested that gratitude may have a unique relationship with well-being and can explain aspects of well-being that other personality traits cannot. Both studies showed that gratitude was able to explain more well-being than the Big Five and 30 of the most commonly studied personality traits.

Gratitude also has a positive impact on physical well-being. For example, in one study, teens who wrote letters expressing gratitude to other people over the course of a month were more inclined to eat healthier food. This phenomenon might be explained by the notion that when people experience gratitude, they are more motivated to reciprocate the kindness shown by others. Therefore, rather than engaging in behaviors that may undermine their own health, they feel driven to adopt healthier lifestyles as a way of acknowledging the support they have received from others. Moreover, gratitude is known to trigger positive emotions, which in turn direct individuals' attention towards optimistic possibilities in the future. As a result, people are more likely to embrace behaviors that are conducive to a better future, such as healthy eating.

People who express gratitude also demonstrate improved overall health by way of greater physical activity, better sleep, fewer health care visits, and better nutrition. Practicing gratitude may be correlated with small improvements in cardiovascular health.

=== Relationship to altruism ===
Gratitude makes people more altruistic. One study found that gratitude correlates with economic generosity. The study used an economic game, and showed increased gratitude to directly mediate increased monetary giving, and that grateful people are more likely to sacrifice individual gains for communal profit. Another study found similar correlations between gratitude and empathy, generosity, and helpfulness towards the creation of social reciprocity, even with strangers, that is beneficial to the individuals in the short and in the middle terms.

=== As a motivator of behavior ===
Gratitude may reinforce future prosocial behavior in benefactors. For example, one experiment found that customers of a jewelry store who were called and thanked showed a subsequent 70% increase in purchases. In comparison, customers who were called and told about a sale showed only a 30% increase in purchases, while customers who were not called at all showed no increase in purchases. In another study, a restaurant's regular patrons gave bigger tips when servers wrote "Thank you" on their checks.

Some social psychologists and positive psychology researchers starkly distinguish between gratitude and indebtedness. While both emotions may occur in response to help or favors, indebtedness is said to occur when an individual subjectively perceives that they are under an obligation to provide repayment or compensation for the aid. The two emotions then lead to different actions: Indebtedness may motivate the recipient to avoid the person who helped them, whereas gratitude may motivate a recipient to seek out their benefactor and to improve their relationship with them. A study of the feelings of migrant adolescents towards their parents noted that "gratitude serves and indebtedness challenges intergenerational relations after migration". The study also noted that, "when the expectations of return from the benefactor increase, indebtedness of the beneficiary increases but gratitude decreases". Unlike compassion or sadness, gratitude decreases cigarette craving suggesting a potential role in public health reductions of appetitive risk behaviors.

=== Psychological interventions ===
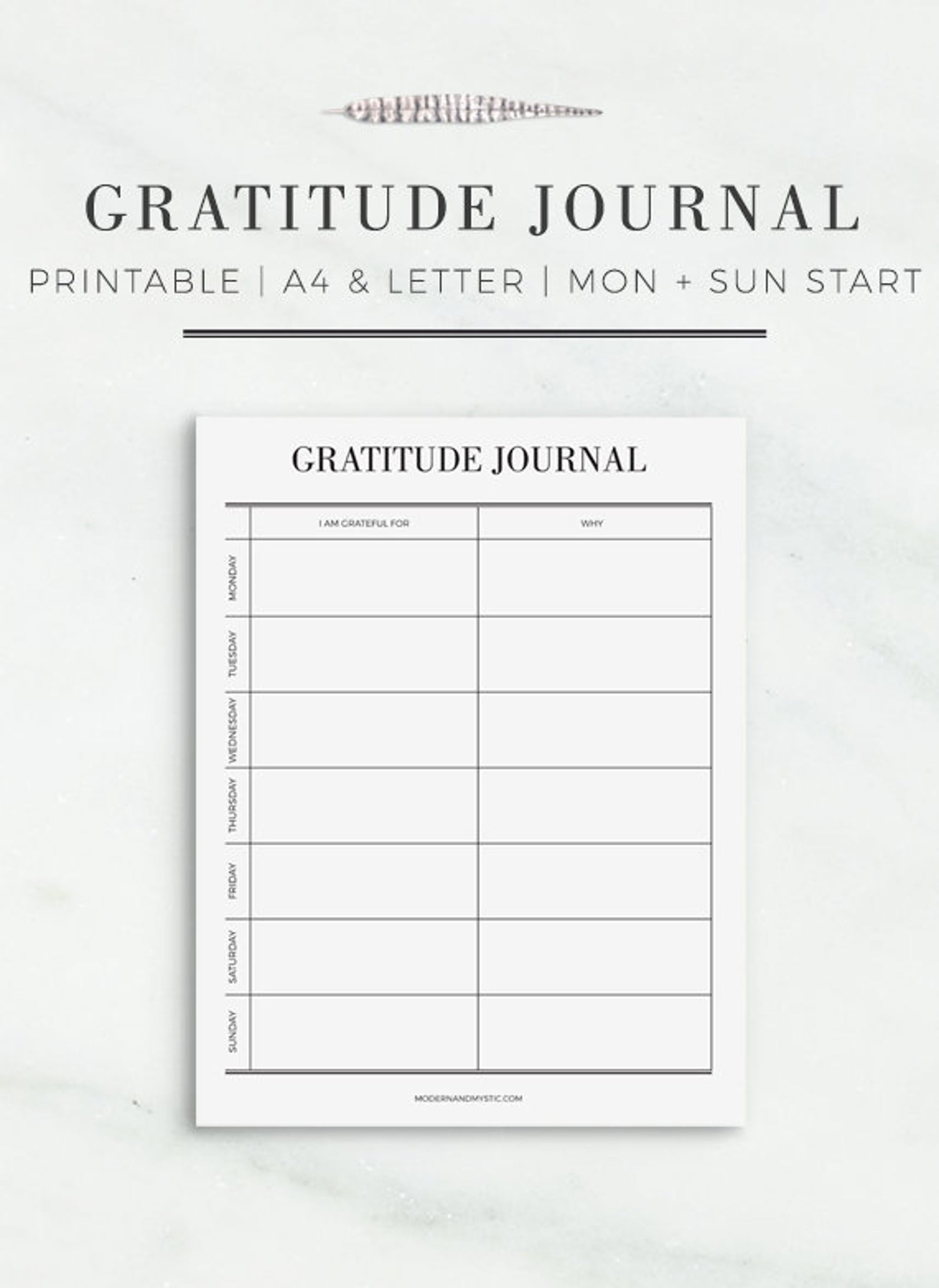
A gratitude journal is a means of learning to focus on things that make one grateful, which can enhance happiness.

Several psychological interventions have been developed to increase gratitude.

For example, Watkins and colleagues had participants test a number of different gratitude exercises, such as thinking about a living person for whom they are grateful, writing about someone for whom they are grateful, and writing a letter to deliver to someone for whom they are grateful. Participants in the control group were asked to describe their living room. Participants who engaged in a gratitude exercise showed increases in their experiences of positive emotion immediately after the exercise, and this effect was strongest for participants who were asked to think about a person for whom they are grateful. Participants who had grateful personalities to begin with showed the greatest benefit from these gratitude exercises.

In another study, participants were randomly assigned to one of six therapeutic intervention conditions designed to improve the participants' overall quality of life. Of these, the biggest short-term effects came from a "gratitude visit" in which participants wrote and delivered a letter of gratitude to someone in their life. This condition showed a rise in happiness scores by 10 percent and a significant fall in depression scores, results that lasted up to one month after the visit. Of the six conditions, the longest-lasting effects were associated with writing "gratitude journals" of three things they were grateful for every day. These participants' happiness scores also increased and continued to increase each time they were tested periodically after the experiment. The greatest benefits were usually found to occur around six months after treatment began. This exercise was so successful that although participants were only asked to continue the journal for a week, many participants continued to keep the journal long after the study was over.

Similar results have been found in studies conducted by Emmons and McCullough (2003) and Lyubomirsky et al. (2005).

The Greater Good Science Center at the University of California, Berkeley, offered awards for dissertation-level research projects with the greatest potential to advance the science and practice of gratitude.

=== Relationship to mental health ===
A study on the benefits of mental health counseling divided approximately 300 college students into three groups prior to their first counseling session. The first group was instructed to write one letter of gratitude a week for three weeks, the second group was asked to write about their negative experiences, and the third group received only counseling. When compared, the first group reported better mental health after completing their writing exercises. The study suggests that practicing gratitude may help the brain react more sensitively to the experience of gratitude in the future, and therefore, may improve mental health.

=== Workplace gratitude ===
Workplace gratitude refers to how employees feel, express, interpret, and receive appreciation at work.

In a 2023 study of working adults in the United States, researchers identified six traits of quality written and verbal gratitude expressions: acknowledgment of positive outcomes, acknowledgment of time and effort, acknowledgment of social support, genuine, personalized, and playful.

==== Multilevel model of workplace gratitude ====
In 2017, Ryan Fehr and colleagues proposed a theoretical multilevel model of workplace gratitude with three separate but intersecting levels:

- Episodic gratitude takes place at the level where gratitude is a brief feeling of appreciation in response to a beneficial experience.
- Persistent gratitude happens at the individual level where gratitude is an individual’s stable tendency to feel grateful within a particular work context, which develops over repeated episodes.
- Collective gratitude is persistent gratitude that is shared by members across the organization.

==== Criticisms of workplace gratitude ====
Workplace gratitude programs can fail. If employees feel like a gratitude program serves the organization’s interests and not theirs, employees can feel manipulated by the organization or jealous of each other.

One study of 883 working professionals described the “dark sides” of managerial gratitude, which refers to the potentially unintended negative consequences of gratitude practices and communications.

== Conclusions ==
Benevolence gladdens constantly the grateful; the ungrateful, however, but once.

— Seneca

Gratitude is not only the greatest of virtues, but the parent of all others.

— Cicero

Multiple studies have shown the positive correlation between gratitude and increased well being, not only for the person expressing gratitude, but for all people involved. The positive psychology movement embraced these studies and, in an effort to increase overall well-being, has begun to incorporate mental and emotional exercises to increase gratitude.

== See also ==
- Gratitude journal – Practice in positive psychology
- Gratitude trap – Type of cognitive distortion
- Praise – Expression of positive recognition, reassurance or admiration
- Universal value – Value that has the same worth for all people
