= William James College =

Private school of psychology in Newton, Massachusetts, U.S.

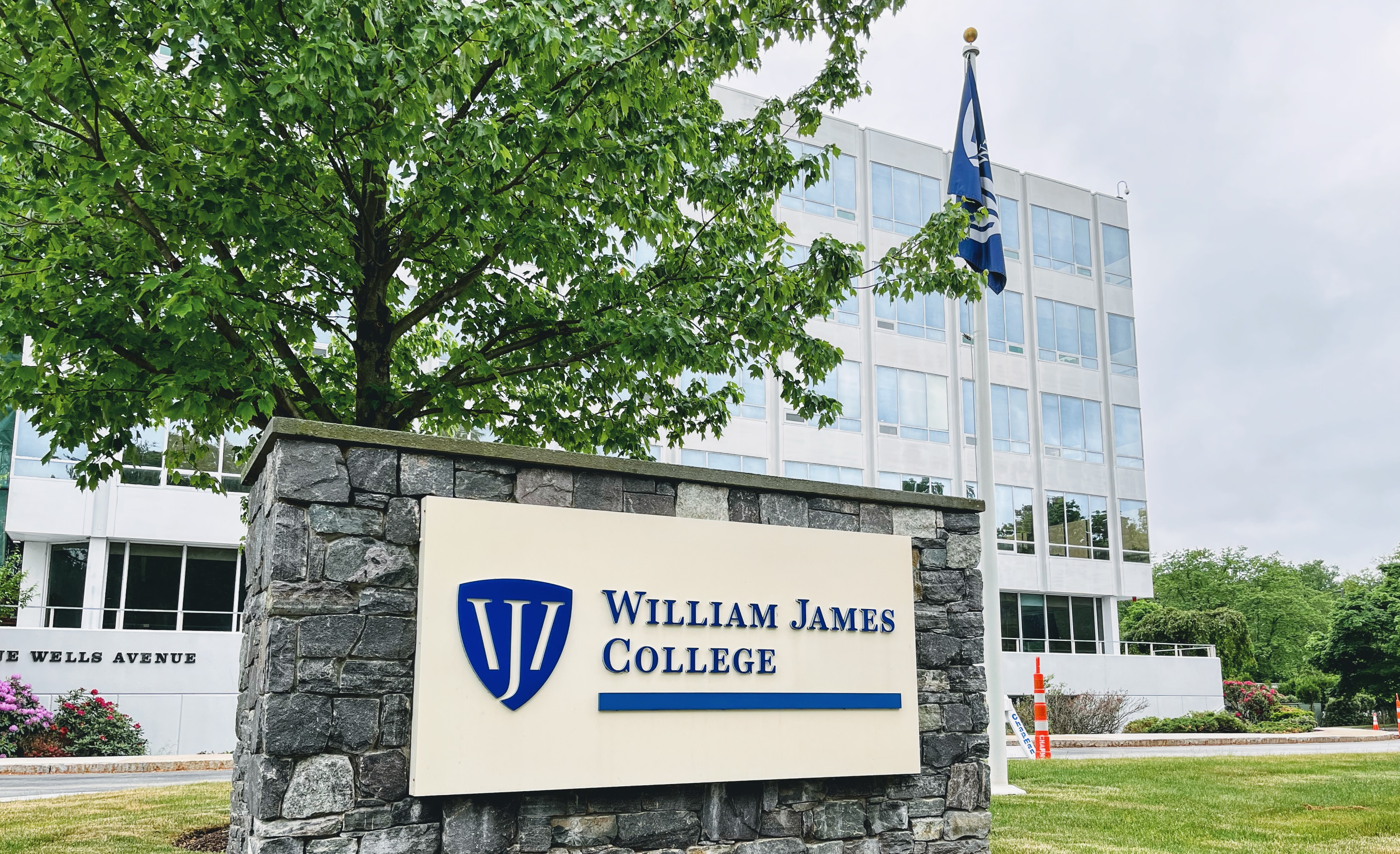
- Former name: Massachusetts School of Professional Psychology (MSPP)
- Motto: Meeting the Need...Making a Difference
- Type: Private college
- Established: 1974; 52 years ago
- Accreditation: NECHE
- Academic affiliations: APA; NASP
- President: Nicholas Covino
- Students: 1100+
- Location: Newton, Massachusetts, United States; 42.2950°N 71.2033°W
- Website: www.williamjames.edu

William James College, formerly the Massachusetts School of Professional Psychology (MSPP), is a private nonprofit college in Newton, Massachusetts, with an additional campus in Providence, Rhode Island. The college emphasizes experiential education by integrating academic instruction with supervised clinical training in psychology, counseling, leadership, and behavioral health.

Academic offerings include the Doctor of Psychology (PsyD) in Clinical Psychology, master’s degrees, graduate certificate programs, continuing education programs, and a Bachelor of Science completion program in Psychology and Human Services across four academic departments.

The college has been accredited by the New England Commission of Higher Education (NECHE) since 1984 and was most recently reaccredited for a 10-year term in 2022. Several academic programs also hold specialized accreditation from the American Psychological Association (APA), the National Association of School Psychologists (NASP), and the Association for Behavior Analysis International (ABAI).

In July 2026, William James College announced the establishment of a second campus in Providence, Rhode Island, where it will offer an additional Doctor of Psychology (PsyD) in Clinical Psychology program beginning in Fall 2027. That same year, the college announced the expansion of its Behavioral Health Service Corps (BHSC) program into Rhode Island.

== History ==
William James College was founded in 1974 as the Massachusetts School of Professional Psychology (MSPP). At the time of its founding, doctoral education in clinical psychology was largely limited to small, highly selective PhD programs with admissions standards comparable to those of medical schools. Existing programs were unable to meet the growing demand for doctoral-level mental health professionals in Massachusetts and across the United States. Approximately two-thirds of psychologists employed by the Massachusetts Department of Mental Health did not hold doctoral degrees.

Three years later, in September 1977, the Massachusetts School of Professional Psychology opened with 10 faculty members under the leadership of Dr. Bruce Weiss as the first president. The inaugural class consisted of 47 students with an average age of 32. Forty-two of them had already earned advanced degrees (one PhD, one Doctor of Laws, 38 master's degrees including two Master of Social Work degrees, and two Certificates of Advanced Graduate Study). Housed on the third floor of a former dormitory at Newton Country Day School, the school provided a curriculum focused on graduate study in applied psychology with the aim of offering an approach that differed from the more common scientist-professional training model of the time.

From its inception, the school incorporated supervised clinical placements early in students' training as part of its experiential education model. Dr. Alan Dodge Beck, then chief psychologist at Trinity Mental Health, was asked by faculty to supervise early students in their clinical placements. He noted the students' dedication to pursuing doctoral training in clinical psychology outside of the traditional PhD pathway. In 1980, Dr. Beck formally joined the faculty and began teaching Integrative Seminars (known today as Clinical Seminars) in cooperation with Dr. Robert Kegan's Developmental Theory course before becoming an administrator and later serving as Dean of the Department of Clinical Psychology.

Initially, the Massachusetts School of Professional Psychology did not have authority to confer the Doctor of Psychology degree and lacked regional accreditation status. In 1980, the school's founders and faculty successfully petitioned the Commonwealth of Massachusetts for degree-granting authority to award the PsyD. The school received regional accreditation from the New England Association of Schools and Colleges in 1984 and provisional accreditation from the American Psychological Association in 1987. The APA granted full accreditation status to the Clinical Psychology PsyD program in 1991.

In 2002, Dr. Weiss stepped down from his position, and Dr. Nicholas A. Covino was named the second president of the Massachusetts School of Professional Psychology. By that time, the institution had grown to become the largest educator of licensed behavioral health and leadership psychology professionals in New England.

Following its relocation to a new campus, the institution undertook a rebranding initiative as its academic offerings expanded beyond its original focus on clinical psychology to include programs in counseling, school psychology, applied behavior analysis, organizational psychology, leadership psychology, and human services. Administrators concluded that the name "Massachusetts School of Professional Psychology" no longer reflected the institution's broader mission and scope and determined that the designation "college" more accurately described its identity. On May 7, 2015, the institution officially adopted the name "William James College," honoring psychologist and philosopher William James, widely regarded as the "father of American psychology," whose emphasis on pragmatism, applied psychology, and experiential education was seen as closely aligned with the college's educational mission.

During Dr. Covino's nearly 25 years as president, William James College expanded from approximately 130 students enrolled in a single doctoral program in clinical psychology to more than 1,100 students across sixteen degree and certificate programs. On May 22, 2026, it was announced that Dr. Covino would be stepping down as president at the end of the 2026/2027 academic year.

== Academics ==
William James College offers Doctor of Psychology (PsyD) degree programs in Clinical Psychology and Leadership Psychology, as well as master's degrees programs, graduate certificate programs, and a bachelor's degree completion program. Many programs offer optional concentrations in specialized areas, including Neuropsychology, Forensic Psychology, Clinical Health Psychology, LGBTQIA+ Studies, and Children and Families of Adversity and Resilience.

Between 2023 and 2024, the college awarded 335 degrees, including 202 master's degrees, 118 doctoral degrees, and 15 bachelor's degrees.

=== Clinical Psychology PsyD ===
The Doctor of Psychology (PsyD) in Clinical Psychology is William James College’s oldest degree program, having been established with the founding of the institution. The college currently offers the five-year, full-time, 134-credit program at its Newton, Massachusetts, campus, where students combine academic coursework with supervised clinical training to prepare for licensure as clinical psychologists. The program is accredited by the American Psychological Association (APA). A separate five-year, 123-credit PsyD program is scheduled to begin at the Providence, Rhode Island, campus in 2027.

A distinguishing feature of the program is its experiential education model, which integrates classroom instruction with supervised clinical training beginning in the first semester. Students complete progressively advanced practicum placements throughout the program at more than 350 affiliated training sites, including hospitals, college and university counseling centers, correctional facilities, and community mental health agencies. In addition to supervised clinical training, students complete a dissertation and a predoctoral internship, which are required for degree completion and eligibility for licensure as clinical psychologists. Students have the opportunity to pursue program-specific Neuropsychology, Forensic Psychology, Clinical Health Psychology, Geropsychology, and Children and Families of Adversity and Resilience. Additionally, students can pursue cross-department concentrations including African and Caribbean Mental Health, Asian Mental Health, Jewish Mental Health, Global Mental Health, Latino Mental Health, LGBTQIA+ Studies, as well as Military and Veterans Psychology.

=== Counseling and Behavioral Health ===
The Counseling and Behavioral Health department offers Master of Arts programs in Clinical Mental Health Counseling, a graduate certificate in Mental Performance Consulting, a Master of Arts in Psychology, and a Bachelor of Science completion program in Psychology and Human Services. The Clinical Mental Health Counseling programs combine supervised clinical training with academic coursework and optional concentrations in Couples and Family Therapy, Forensic and Correctional Counseling, Health and Behavioral Medicine, Substance Use and Addictions Counseling, and LGBTQIA+ Studies, as well as several cross-departmental concentrations.

=== Organizational and Leadership Psychology ===
The Organizational and Leadership Psychology department offers a Doctor of Psychology (PsyD) in Leadership Psychology, a Master of Arts in Organizational Psychology, and graduate certificates in Executive Coaching and School Leadership. It also offers the Leading Transformative Mental Health in Schools graduate certificate in collaboration with the Center for Behavioral Health, Equity, and Leadership in Schools (BHELS), designed to prepare school teachers and leaders to address growing behavioral and emotional regulation struggles among youth. Programs in the department apply psychological theory and research to leadership, organizational development, and workplace behavior.

=== School Psychology ===
The School Psychology department offers a NASP-accredited Master of Arts/Certificate of Advanced Graduate Study in School Psychology program providing eligibility for licensure as a school psychologist and a Master of Arts or post-graduate certificate in Applied Behavior Analysis which will satisfy the coursework requirements to become a Board Certified Behavior Analyst (BCBA). Optional concentrations include School Psychology and Transformative School Leadership.

== Field education ==
William James College maintains relationships with more than 350 field placement sites, including hospitals, mental health centers, public schools, prisons and correctional facilities, and recovery centers. Students in several academic programs complete supervised field placements that integrate practical experience with coursework. Depending on their program and placement, students may have the opportunity to conduct psychological assessments, administer intake evaluations, provide psychotherapy, or participate in consultation under supervision and guidance from professionals including clinical psychologists, mental health counselors, school psychologists, and organizational psychologists.

== Research ==
Research at William James College is coordinated in part by the Center for Psychological Science (CPS), which was established in 2020 to support psychological research college-wide. The center oversees institutional research policies and resources, supports faculty and student research, recognizes and award achievements in research, and facilitates the dissemination of research through publications, conferences, and presentations. It also provides access to William James College's independent Institutional Review Board.

Research is incorporated into the college's doctoral programs through dissertations and doctoral projects. Students in the Clinical Psychology PsyD program complete a doctoral dissertation involving the development and execution of a unique research study under the supervision of a faculty member. The dissertation process involves developing a research proposal, collecting and analyzing data, and presenting findings through a doctoral colloquium. Students in the Leadership Psychology PsyD program complete a doctoral project integrating research with an area of professional practice.

== Student body ==
William James College enrolls more than 1,100 students across 16 academic programs. According to the college, students range in age from their early 20s to their late 60s, with a median age between 25 and 29 years. Approximately 22% of students are self-reported minorities, 13% are foreign-born, and about 12% are students with disabilities.

Among the 21% of students who speak at least one language other than English, Spanish was the most commonly spoken (38%), followed by Portuguese (9%), French (8%), Arabic (7%), Russian (7%), and Creole (6%).

Fall 2024 enrollment totaled 1,101 students. Women comprised 81% of the student body. White women represented the largest demographic group (57%), followed by Hispanic/Latino women (14%), Black or African American women (13%), Asian women (7%), and multiracial women (3%).

Among the Fall 2025 entering class, 31% were first-generation college students, 48% identified as BIPOC, and more than one-third came from outside Massachusetts. Students represented 34 U.S. states and territories, including Alaska and Guam, making it one of the most geographically diverse entering classes in recent years.

== Centers and Initiatives ==
William James College operates a number of academic and research centers, as well as specialized initiatives to provide clinical training, workforce development, and community-based mental health programs. These initiatives support the college's emphasis on experiential education and culturally responsive behavioral health services.

=== Center for Multicultural and Global Mental Health ===
The Center for Multicultural and Global Mental Health (CMGMH) is an academic, clinical training, and research center promoting social justice and mental health care access among underserved and historically marginalized populations in the U.S. and abroad. It oversees the Latino Mental Health, African and Caribbean Mental Health, Asian Mental Health, and Global Mental Health concentrations. Students enrolled in these concentrations participate in the Service Learning and Cultural Immersion programs in both local and international settings, including Ecuador, Guyana, Vietnam, and Kenya. The Center collaborates with international partners to expand access to behavioral health services and provide professional training, including the Guyana Suicide Prevention Gatekeeper Training, and supports community partnerships such as the Haitian Mental Health Network.

The CMGMH administers the Serving the Mental Health Needs of the Underserved Scholarship, which provides financial support and specialized training to graduate students committed to improving access to mental health care in underserved communities while increasing diversity at the college and the behavioral health workforce. Additionally, the Center for Multicultural and Global Mental Health collaborates with the Dr. Cynthia Lucero Center for Latino Mental Health to sponsor the Cynthia Lucero Scholarship, which provides financial support to a student dedicated to delivering care to the Latino community.

The Black Mental Health Graduate Academy operates within the Center as an academic and leadership development program that provides mentorship, professional development, and career support for Black graduate students studying psychology, mental health counseling, and leadership. Academy Scholars are prepared to diversify the behavioral health workforce and improve access to mental heath care in underserved communities.

=== Dr. Cynthia Lucero Center for Latino Mental Health ===
The Dr. Cynthia Lucero Center for Latino Mental Health was founded by the friends and family of Cynthia Lucero, a graduate of William James College who died in 2002, with the aim of increasing the number of Latino mental health service providers. The Center sponsors the Lucero Latino Mental Health Training Program, a concentration that focuses on the mental health needs of Latino patients and clients. The program includes coursework and summer immersion programs in Costa Rica and Ecuador designed to improve Spanish language proficiency and provide exposure to Hispanic cultures through community-based mental health work. The Lucero Center also sponsors lectures and scholarships in Cynthia Lucero's memory, including the Cynthia Lucero Scholarship.

=== Center for Workforce Development ===
The Center for Workforce Development coordinates workforce development, professional education, and grant-supported initiatives across academic departments and concentrations. It offers a variety of educational opportunities and training programs to prepare students and professionals to meet the growing demand for culturally responsive mental health care across local communities and the United States.

The Child and Adolescent Mental Health Initiative (CAMHI) was established in 2019 to expand access to culturally responsive mental health care for children, adolescents, and transitional-age youth in underserved communities. Each year, 20 graduate fellows are selected to receive specialized training and mentorship following a competitive application process. It provides students in clinical psychology, counseling and behavioral health, and school psychology with specialized training, mentorship, stipends, and community-based field placements to prepare them for careers serving youth and families.

The Helping Addiction with Knowledge (HAWK) Program prepares master's-level Clinical Mental Health Counseling students to work with individuals experiencing substance use disorders and addictions. It providers specialized training, mentorship, interdisciplinary field placements, and financial stipends to seven graduate trainees completing internships in integrated behavioral health and primary care settings.

The Behavioral Health Service Corps is a year-long paid service and learning opportunity for college graduates, providing entry-level job experience in behavioral health care and credits toward a master's degree in Clinical Mental Health Counseling at William James College. Students receive mentorship and participate in training before working at a partner agency supporting individuals in historically underserved populations.

=== Programs and Support for Service Members, Veterans, and their Families ===
The Train Vets to Treat Vets program (TVTV) collaborates with the Massachusetts Executive Office of Veterans Services to provide support for service members, veterans, and military family members enrolled at William James College. In 2011, William James College was awarded a grant from the Commonwealth of Massachusetts, working to recruit and train veterans to meet the mental health needs of their fellow servicemen and women. William James College participates in the Veteran's Affairs Yellow Ribbon Program, and provides matching grants of up to $10000 to an unlimited number of eligible veterans.

=== Community Services ===
Several clinical and community service programs operate within William James College to provide psychological and behavior health services to the public while serving as training settings for graduate students. The Dr. Leon O. Brenner Center for Psychological Assessment and Consultation provides psychological, neuropsychological, advice educational assessments for individuals across the lifespan. The college's Youth and Family Psychotherapy Services program provides psychotherapy to children, adolescents, and families and serves as a training site for advanced doctoral students within the William James College Internship Consortium.

== Accreditation ==
William James College is accredited by the New England Commission of Higher Education and is authorized by the Massachusetts Department of Higher Education to grant PsyD, CAGS, MA, MS, and BS degrees.

The Massachusetts-based Clinical Psychology Doctoral Program is accredited by the American Psychological Association and was awarded reaccreditation in 2022 for 10 years, the maximum term. Additionally, the William James College Internship Consortium is accredited by the American Psychological Association.

The MA/CAGS in School Psychology Program is fully accredited by the National Association of School Psychologists.

The Applied Behavior Analysis course sequence has been verified by the Behavior Analyst Certification Board, Inc. as meeting the coursework requirements for eligibility to take the Board Certified Behavior Analyst Examination.

The Graduate Certificate in Education Coaching Program has ICF Level 1 accreditation from the International Coaching Federation.
