= Sandra Witelson =

Canadian neuroscientist

Sandra Freedman Witelson is a Canadian neuroscientist best known for her analysis of specimens from Albert Einstein's brain, as well as exploring anatomic and functional differences regarding male and female brains, handedness, and sexual orientation. She and her colleagues maintain the world's largest collection of "cognitively normal" brains (numbering 125 as of 2006) at McMaster University in Hamilton, Ontario.

== Research ==
=== Albert Einstein's brain ===
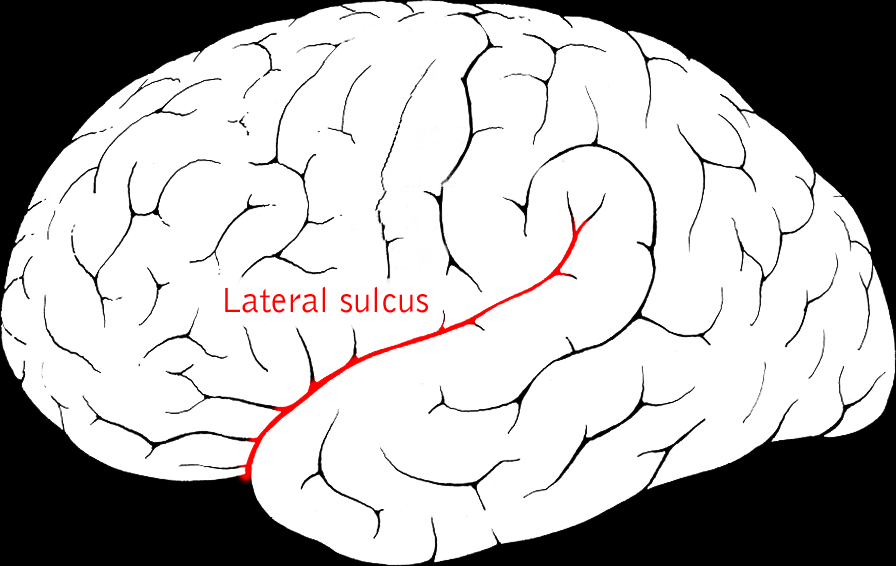
The lateral sulcus (Sylvian fissure) in a normal brain. In Einstein's brain, this was truncated.

Witelson came into possession of three portions of Albert Einstein's brain after being contacted by Dr. Thomas Stoltz Harvey, the pathologist at the hospital where Einstein died. In 1955, he took the brain and, after preserving, photographing, and creating slides from it, gave out limited portions for research. Years later, after hearing of Witelson's brain bank, he sent her a fax asking if she would like to study it, and she told him yes.

Her analysis, with a credit to Harvey as well as her research assistant, was published in a 1999 paper titled "The exceptional brain of Albert Einstein". In it, she stated that the brain had a 15% wider inferior parietal region as well as a shorter than normal lateral sulcus. As the parietal lobe is the center for visuospatial perception and navigation, and the shorter sulcus would have allowed more of the area to be physically connected, she proposed that this may have allowed Einstein higher functionality in this area.

=== Anatomical asymmetry ===
In 1973, she investigated anatomical asymmetry in newborns' brains. Witelson found that anatomical and functional asymmetry of the brain is present at birth.

=== Differences between males and females ===
Witelson published a paper in 1976 detailing how the brains of six-year-old boys use a single hemisphere when reading, whereas girls use both sides of the brain while performing the same task. She also found that female brains had a thicker corpus callosum - the bridge between hemispheres - and that the thickness was in the region of linguistic skills. A different study showed that women have more brain cells than men in the language region. She also noted that the amygdala, which becomes more active in times of negative stress, signals more strongly to areas controlling motor skills in men, whereas in women, it signals more to the hypothalamus, which controls internal functions such as breathing and heart rate.

Witelson conducted a study testing intelligence relative to brain size in 100 neurologically normal, but terminally ill, volunteers who agreed to have their brains measured after they died, and took extensive personal data on them. Her findings were that, overall, larger brains fared better. Brain size decreased with age in men over the age span of 25 to 80 years, but for unknown reasons, age minimally affected brain size in the women. Verbal and spatial intelligence in women was connected with brain size, but in men, verbal intelligence was better for right-handers only, most likely due to the brain's asymmetry. Spatial ability in men was unchanged relative to brain size.

=== Sexual orientation ===
In yet another study, Witelson found that the corpus callosum was thicker in homosexual men than in heterosexual men. Although that structure, as well as the amygdala, are formed early, indicating a possible genetic component to homosexuality, she said causality cannot be assumed and still needs to be investigated.

== Personal life ==
Witelson was born and raised in Montreal, Quebec and resides in Hamilton, Ontario. She is currently a professor in the Department of Psychiatry & Behavioral Neurosciences, at McMaster University's Michael G. DeGroote School of Medicine. She received her PhD at McGill University.
