= Anti-social behaviour =

Set of actions that harm or lack consideration for the well-being of others

Anti-social behaviours, sometimes called dissocial behaviours, are actions that are considered to violate the rights of or otherwise harm others by committing crime or nuisance, such as stealing and physical attack or noncriminal behaviours such as lying and manipulation. It is considered to be disruptive to others in society. This can be carried out in various ways, including not limited to intentional aggression, as well as covert and overt hostility. Anti-social behaviour also develops through social interaction within the family and community. It continuously affects a child's temperament, cognitive ability, and involvement with negative peers, dramatically affecting children's cooperative problem-solving skills. Many people also label behaviour which is deemed contrary to prevailing norms for social conduct as anti-social behaviour. However, researchers have stated that it is a difficult term to define, particularly in the United Kingdom where many acts fall into its category. The term is especially used in Irish English and British English.

Although the term is fairly new to the common lexicon, the word anti-social behaviour has been used for many years in the psychosocial world where it was defined as "unwanted behaviour as the result of personality disorder." For example, David Farrington, a British criminologist and forensic psychologist, stated that teenagers can exhibit anti-social behaviour by engaging in various amounts of wrongdoings such as stealing, vandalism, sexual promiscuity, excessive smoking, heavy drinking, confrontations with parents, and gambling. In children, conduct disorders could result from ineffective parenting. Anti-social behaviour is typically associated with other behavioural and developmental issues such as hyperactivity, depression, learning disabilities, and impulsivity. Alongside these issues, one can be predisposed or more inclined to develop such behaviour due to one's genetics, neurobiological and environmental stressors in the prenatal stage of one's life, through the early childhood years.

The American Psychiatric Association, in its Diagnostic and Statistical Manual of Mental Disorders, diagnoses persistent anti-social behaviour starting from a young age as antisocial personality disorder. Genetic factors include abnormalities in the prefrontal cortex of the brain while neurobiological risk factors include maternal drug use during pregnancy, birth complications, low birth weight, prenatal brain damage, traumatic head injury, and chronic illness. The World Health Organization includes it in the International Classification of Diseases as dissocial personality disorder. A pattern of persistent anti-social behaviours can also be present in children and adolescents diagnosed with conduct problems, including conduct disorder or oppositional defiant disorder under the DSM-5. It has been suggested that individuals with intellectual disabilities have a higher tendency to display anti-social behaviours, but this may be related to social deprivation and mental health problems. More research is required on this topic.

== Development ==
Intent and discrimination may determine both pro-social and anti-social behaviour. Infants may act in seemingly anti-social ways and yet be generally accepted as too young to know the difference before the age of four or five. Berger states that parents should teach their children that "emotions need to be regulated, not depressed". One problem with the assumption that a behaviour that is "simply ignorant" in infants would have antisocial causes in persons older than four or five years at the same time as the latter are supposed to have more complex brains (and with it a more advanced consciousness) is that it presumes that what appears to be the same behaviour would have fewer possible causes in a more complex brain than in a less complex brain, which is criticized because a more complex brain increases the number of possible causes of what looks like the same behaviour as opposed to decreasing it.

Studies have shown that in children between ages 13–14 who bully or show aggressive behaviour towards others exhibit anti-social behaviours in their early adulthood. There are strong statistical relationships that show this significant association between childhood aggressiveness and anti-social behaviours. Analyses saw that 20% of these children who exhibit anti-social behaviours at later ages had court appearances and police contact as a result of their behaviour.

Many of the studies regarding the media's influence on anti-social behaviour have been deemed inconclusive. Some reviews have found strong correlations between aggression and the viewing of violent media, while others find little evidence to support their case. The only unanimously accepted truth regarding anti-social behaviour is that parental guidance carries an undoubtedly strong influence; providing children with brief negative evaluations of violent characters helps to reduce violent effects in the individual.

== Cause and effects ==
=== Family ===
Families greatly impact the causation of anti-social behaviour. Some other familial causes are parent history of anti-social behaviours, parental alcohol and drug abuse, unstable home life, absence of good parenting, physical abuse, parental instability (mental health issues/PTSD) and economic distress within the family.

=== Neurobiology ===
Studies have found that there is a link between antisocial behaviour and increased amygdala activity specifically centered around facial expressions that are based in anger. This research focuses on the fact that the symptom of over reactivity to perceived threats that comes with antisocial behaviour may be from this increase in amygdala activity. This focus on perceived threat does not include emotions centered around distress.

=== Consumption patterns ===
There is a small link between antisocial personality characteristics in adulthood and more TV watching as a child. The risk of early adulthood criminal conviction increased by nearly 30 percent with each hour children spent watching TV on an average weekend. Peers can also impact one's predisposition to anti-social behaviours, in particular, children in peer groups are more likely to associate with anti-social behaviours if present within their peer group. Especially within youth, patterns of lying, cheating and disruptive behaviours found in young children are early signs of anti-social behaviour. Adults must intervene if they notice their children providing these behaviours. Early detection is best in the preschool and middle school years for the best hopes of interrupting the trajectory of these negative patterns. These patterns in children can lead to conduct disorder, a disorder that is characterized by children rebelling against age-appropriate norms. Moreover, these offences can lead to oppositional defiant disorder, which is characterized by children being defiant against adults, and which leads to vindictive behaviours and patterns. Furthermore, children who exhibit anti-social behaviour are more prone to alcoholism in adulthood.

== Intervention and treatment ==
As a high prevalence mental health problem in children, many interventions and treatments are developed to prevent anti-social behaviours and to help reinforce pro-social behaviours.

Several factors are considered as direct or indirect causes of developing anti-social behaviour in children. Addressing these factors is necessary to develop a reliable and effective intervention or treatment. Children's perinatal risk, temperament, intelligence, nutrition level, and interaction with parents or caregivers can influence their behaviours. As for parents or caregivers, their personality traits, behaviours, socioeconomic status, social network, and living environment can also affect children's development of anti-social behaviour.

An individual's age at intervention is a strong predictor of the effectiveness of a given treatment. The specific kinds of anti-social behaviours exhibited, as well as the magnitude of those behaviours also impact how effective a treatment is for an individual. Behavioural parent training (BPT) is more effective to preschool or elementary school-aged children, and cognitive behavioural therapy (CBT) has higher effectiveness for adolescents. Moreover, early intervention of anti-social behaviour is relatively more promising. For preschool children, family is the main consideration for the context of intervention and treatment. The interaction between children and parents or caregivers, parenting skills, social support, and socioeconomic status would be the factors. For school-aged children, the school context also needs to be considered. The collaboration amongst parents, teachers, and school psychologists is usually recommended to help children develop the ability of resolving conflicts, managing their anger, developing positive interactions with other students, and learning pro-social behaviours within both home and school settings.

Moreover, the training for parents or caregivers are also important. Their children would be more likely to learn positive social behaviours and reduce inappropriate behaviours if they become good role models and have effective parenting skills.

=== Cognitive behavioural therapy ===
Cognitive behavioural therapy (CBT), is a highly effective, evidence-based therapy, in relation to anti-social behaviour. This type of treatment focuses on enabling the patients to create an accurate image of the self, allowing the individuals to find the trigger of their harmful actions and changing how individuals think and act in social situations. Due to their impulsivity, their inability to form trusting relationships and their nature of blaming others when a situation arises, individuals with particularly aggressive anti-social behaviours tend to have maladaptive social cognitions, including hostile attribution bias, which lead to negative behavioural outcomes. CBT has been found to be more effective for older children and less effective for younger children. Problem-solving skills training (PSST) is a type of CBT that aims to recognize and correct how an individual thinks and consequently behaves in social environments. This training provides steps to assist people in obtaining the skill to be able to evaluate potential solutions to problems occurring outside of therapy and learn how to create positive solutions to avoid physical aggression and resolve conflict.

Therapists, when providing CBT intervention to individuals with anti-social behaviour, should first assess the level of the risk of the behaviour in order to establish a plan on the duration and intensity of the intervention. Moreover, therapists should support and motivate individuals to practice the new skills and behaviours in environments and contexts where the conflicts would naturally occur to observe the effects of CBT.

=== Behavioural parent training ===
Behavioural parent training (BPT) or parent management training (PMT), focuses on changing how parents interact with their children and equips them with ways to recognize and change their child's maladaptive behaviour in a variety of situations. BPT assumes that individuals are exposed to reinforcements and punishments daily and that anti-social behaviour, which can be learned, is a result of these reinforcements and punishments. Since certain types of interactions between parents and children may reinforce a child's anti-social behaviour, the aim of BPT is to teach the parent effective skills to better manage and communicate with their child. This could be done by reinforcing pro-social behaviours while punishing or ignoring anti-social behaviours. The effects of this therapy can be seen only if the newly acquired communication methods are maintained. BPT has been found to be most effective for younger children under the age of 12. Researchers credit the effectiveness of this treatment at younger ages due to the fact that younger children are more reliant on their parents. BPT is used to treat children with conduct problems, but also for children with ADHD.

According to a meta-analysis, the effectiveness of BPT is supported by short-term changes on the children's anti-social behaviour. However, whether these changes are maintained over a longer period of time is still unclear.

=== Psychotherapy ===
Psychotherapy or talk therapy, although not always effective, can also be used to treat individuals with anti-social behaviour. Individuals can learn skills such as anger and violence management. This type of therapy can help individuals with anti-social behaviour bridge the gap between their feelings and behaviours, which they lack the connection previously. It is most effective when specific issues are being discussed with individuals with anti-social behaviours, rather than a broad general concept. This type of therapy works well with individuals who are at a mild to moderate stage of anti-social behaviour since they still have some sense of responsibility regarding their own problems. Mentalization-based treatment is another form of group psychotherapy shifting its focus on the relational and mental factors related to anti-social personality disorder rather than anger management and violent acts. This particular group therapy targets the mentalizing vulnerabilities and attachment patterns of patients by using a semi-structured group process focused on personal formulation and by establishing group values to promote learning from other members and generating "we-ness".

When working with individuals with anti-social behaviour, therapists must be mindful of building a trusting therapeutic relationship since these individuals might have never experienced rewarding relationships. Therapists also need to be reminded that changes might take place slowly, thus an ability for noticing small changes and constant encouragement for individuals with anti-social behaviour to continue the intervention are required.

==== Family therapy ====
Family therapy, which is a type of psychotherapy, helps promote communication between family members, thus resolving conflicts related to anti-social behaviour. Since family exerts enormous influence over children's development, it is important to identify the behaviours that could potentially lead to anti-social behaviours in children. It is a relatively short-term therapy which involves the family members who are willing to participate. Family therapy can be used to address specific topics such as aggression. The therapy may end when the family can resolve conflicts without needing the therapists to intervene.

== Diagnosis ==
=== Distinguishing from antisocial personality disorder ===
When looking at non-ASPD patients (who show anti-social behaviour) and ASPD patients, it all comes down to the same types of behaviours. However, ASPD is a personality disorder which is defined by the consistency and stability of the observed behaviour, in this case, anti-social behaviour. Antisocial personality disorder can only be diagnosed when a pattern of anti-social behaviour began being noticeable during childhood and/or early teens and remained stable and consistent across time and context. In the official DSM IV-TR for ASPD, it is specified that the anti-social behaviour has to occur outside of time frames surrounding traumatic life events or manic episodes (if the individual is diagnosed with another mental disorder). The diagnosis for ASPD cannot be done before the age of 18. For example, someone who exhibits anti-social behaviour with their family but pro-social behaviour with friends and coworkers would not qualify for ASPD because the behaviour is not consistent across context. Someone who was consistently behaving in a pro-social way and then begins exhibiting anti-social behaviour in response to a specific life event would not qualify for ASPD either because the behaviour is not stable across time.

Law breaking behaviour in which the individuals are putting themselves or others at risk is considered anti-social even if it is not consistent or stable (examples: speeding, use of drugs, getting in physical conflict). In relation to the previous statement, juvenile delinquency is a core element to the diagnosis of ASPD. Individuals who begin getting in trouble with the law (in more than one area) at an abnormally early age (around 15) and keep recurrently doing so in adulthood may be suspected of having ASPD.

=== Evidence: frustration and aggression ===
With some limitations, research has established a correlation between frustration and aggression when it comes to anti-social behaviour. The presence of anti-social behaviour may be detected when an individual is experiencing an abnormally high amount of frustrations in their daily life routine and when those frustrations always result into aggression. The term impulsivity is commonly used to describe this behavioural pattern. Anti-social behaviour can also be detected if the aggressiveness and impulsiveness of the individual's behaviour in response to frustrations is so that it causes obstruction to social interactions and achievement of personal goals. In both of these cases, we can consider the different types of treatment and therapy previously mentioned in this article.

- Examples in childhood: unable to make friends, unable to follow rules, getting kicked out of school, unable to fulfill minimal levels of education (elementary school, middle school).
- Examples in early adulthood: unable to keep a job or an apartment, difficulty with maintaining relationships.

== Prognosis ==
The prognosis of having anti-social behaviour long-term is not very favourable due to its high consistency throughout child development. Studies have shown that children who are aggressive and have conduct problems are more likely to have anti-social behaviour in adolescence. Early intervention of anti-social behaviour is relatively more effective, since the anti-social pattern lasts for a shorter period of time. Moreover, since younger children would have smaller social networks and less social activities, fewer contexts need to be considered for the intervention and treatment. For adolescents, studies have shown that the influence of treatments becomes less effective.

The prognosis is unrelated to the duration of treatment. Long-term follow-up is also necessary to confirm that the intervention or treatment is effective.

Individuals who exhibit anti-social behaviour are more likely to use drugs and abuse alcohol. This could make the prognosis worse since they may become less involved in social activities, and would therefore become more isolated.

== By location ==
=== United Kingdom ===
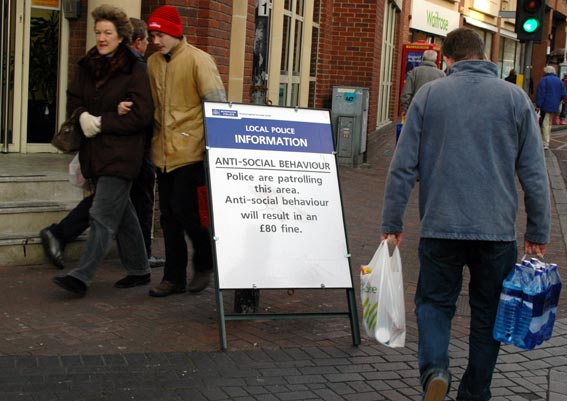
ASBO warning in London

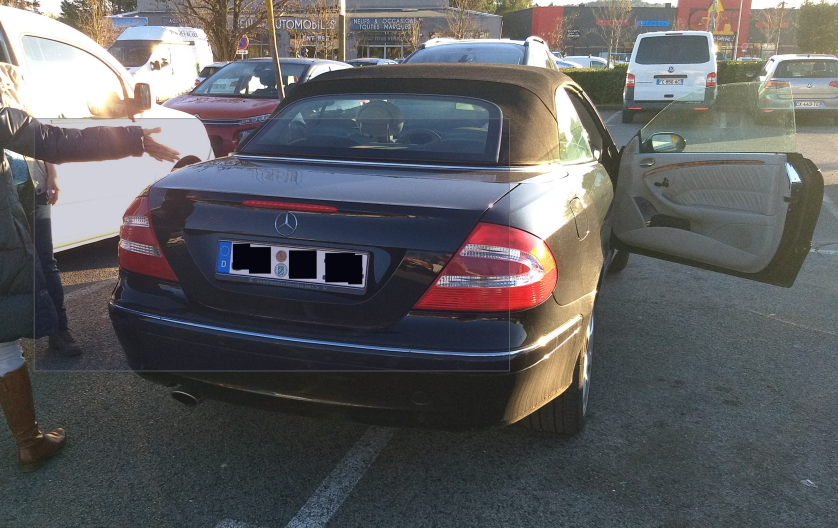
A car that has taken up two spaces in a car park

An anti-social behaviour order (ASBO) is a civil order made against a person who has been shown, on the balance of evidence, to have engaged in anti-social behaviour. The orders, introduced in the United Kingdom by Prime Minister Tony Blair in 1998, were designed to criminalize minor incidents that would not have warranted prosecution before.

The Crime and Disorder Act 1998 defines anti-social behaviour as acting in a manner that has "caused or was likely to cause harassment, alarm or distress to one or more persons not of the same household" as the perpetrator. There has been debate concerning the vagueness of this definition.

However, among legal professionals in the UK there are behaviours commonly considered to fall under the definitions of anti-social behaviour. These include, but are not limited to, threatening or intimidating actions, racial or religious harassment, verbal abuse, and physical abuse.

In a survey conducted by University College London during May 2006, the UK was thought by respondents to be Europe's worst country for anti-social behaviour, with 76% believing Britain had a "big or moderate problem".

Current legislation governing anti-social behaviour in the UK is the Anti-Social Behaviour, Crime and Policing Act 2014 which received Royal Assent in March 2014 and came into enforcement in October 2014. This replaces tools such as the ASBO with 6 streamlined tools designed to make it easier to act on anti-social behaviour.

=== Australia ===
Anti-social behaviour can have a negative effect and impact on Australian communities and their perception of safety. The Western Australia Police force define anti-social behaviour as any behaviour that annoys, irritates, disturbs or interferes with a person's ability to go about their lawful business. In Australia, many different acts are classed as anti-social behaviour, such as: misuse of public space; disregard for community safety; disregard for personal well-being; acts directed at people; graffiti; protests; liquor offences; and drunk driving. It has been found that it is very common for Australian adolescents to engage in different levels of anti-social behaviour. A survey was conducted in 1996 in New South Wales, Australia, of 441, 234 secondary school students in years 7 to 12 about their involvement in anti-social activities. 38.6% reported intentionally damaging or destroying someone else's property, 22.8% admitted to having received or selling stolen goods and close to 40% confessed to attacking someone with the idea of hurting them. The Australian community are encouraged to report any behaviour of concern and play a vital role assisting police in reducing anti-social behaviour. One study conducted in 2016 established how perpetrators of anti-social behaviour may not actually intend to cause offense. The study examined anti-social behaviours (or microaggressions) within the LGBTIQ community on a university campus. The study established how many members felt that other people would often commit anti-social behaviours, however there was no explicit suggestion of any maliciousness behind these acts. Rather, it was just that the offenders were naive to the impact of their behaviour.

The Western Australia Police force uses a three-step strategy to deal with anti-social behaviour.

1. Prevention – This action uses community engagement, intelligence, training and development and the targeting of hotspots, attempting to prevent unacceptable behaviour from occurring.
2. Response – A timely and effective response to anti-social behaviour is vital. Police provide ownership, leadership and coordination to apprehend offenders.
3. Resolution – Identifying the underlying issues that cause anti-social behaviour and resolve these issues with the help of the community. Offenders are successfully prosecuted.

== See also ==
- Abnormality (behavior) – Behavioral characteristic
- Antisocial personality disorder – Personality disorder
- Callous and unemotional traits – Persistent pattern of behavior reflecting disregard and lack of empathy for others
- Criminality – Unlawful act punishable by an authority
- Conduct disorder – Childhood behavioral disorder
- Cruelty – Pleasure in inflicting suffering
- Deviance (sociology) – Action or behavior that violates social norms
- Juvenile delinquency – Illegal behavior by minors
- Proactive policing – Police presence for crime deterrence
- Psychopathy – Personality construct
