= Family resilience =

An important part of the heritage of family resilience is the concept of individual psychological resilience which originates from work with children focusing on what helped them become resilient in the face of adversity. Individual resilience emerged primarily in the field of developmental psychopathology as scholars sought to identify the characteristics of children that allowed them to function "OK" after adversity. Individual resilience gradually moved into understanding the processes associated with overcoming adversity, then into prevention and intervention and now focuses on examining how factors at multiple levels of the system (e.g., molecular, individual, family, community) and using interdisciplinary approaches (e.g., medical, social services, education) promote resilience. Resilience also has origins to the field of positive psychology. The term resilience gradually changed definitions and meanings, from a personality trait to a dynamic process of families, individuals, and communities.

Family resilience emerged as scholars incorporated together ideas from general systems theory perspectives on families, family stress theory, and psychological resilience perspectives. Two prominent approaches to family resilience are to view families as contexts of individual resilience and families as systems. In the field of family therapy the families as systems approach to family resilience is often used based on the assumption that significant risk, protective mechanisms, and positive adaptation occur at multiple interrelated system levels (individual, subsystem, system, or ecosystem). Thus, family resilience involves the application of concepts such as resilience, adaptation and coping to a significant stressor or adversity from a family systems perspective.

== Definition ==
One of the common factors associated with successful adaptation and coping is identified as resilience of individual family members. Resilience can be generally defined as the ability to "bounce back" to healthy functioning when faced with significant stressors and events. The concept of resilience has been heavily researched in adolescents and now includes specific character traits and behaviors known as protective and recovery factors. Previously, researchers have focused on identifying the characteristics of resilient individuals and started to explore the possibility of family resilience and family coping with stress. Currently, researchers are focused on specific interventions to increase resilience in the family unit, while considering related genetic and environmental factors.

There are diverse definitions of what resilience and/or family resilience is. The National Network for Family Resiliency defines resilience as "the family's ability to cultivate strengths to positively meet the challenges of life". Atkinson, Martin, & Rankin define resilience as "the ability to bounce back and have better physical and mental health outcomes". For family resilience specifically, McCubbin & McCubbin have posited that "family resilience includes the characteristics, dimensions, and properties of families which help families to be resilient to disruption in the face of change and adaptive in the face of crisis situations".

Using a combination of the above work, family resilience can be generally defined as: a dynamic process of families that have been exposed to a significant stressor or adversity that requires protective and recovery factors, identified by the family, as helpful to promote healthy coping in families and their self-identified family members. In the February 2015 special issue of Family Relations (journal) on individual and family resilience, authors provide a variety of definitions of family resilience. For example, Masten and Monn (p. 6) define resilience as "the capacity for adapting successfully in the context of adversity".

== Research ==
Resilience and family resilience have been studied in the context of various theoretical underpinnings. These include Bandura's Self-Efficacy Theory, Lazarus' Stress Theory, Froma Walsh's Family Resilience Framework, and McCubbin and Patterson's Family Stress and Resilience Model. The family stress theory originates from the family systems model that considers all members of the family as important and as a system where all parts and interactions between and among those parts as important. The Family Stress and Resilience Model by McCubbin & McCubbin has been adopted by the field of family nursing because of the use in diverse families and because of the connection to the nursing metaparadigm of person, environment, health, and nursing This strong theoretical connection to resilience and nursing supports the interest from nursing, which focuses on caring for diverse families and individuals in a holistic manner.

Henry, Morris, & Harrist proposed the overarching Family Resilience Model (FRM) as a general model of family resilience within which existing models fit as ways of looking at family resilience. Based on a review of existing individual and family resilience scholarship, these authors developed the FRM to include key ideas from individual resilience, proposing that significant risk suggests increased risk for negative outcomes. This risk can be lowered through protective mechanisms, increasing the potential for positive outcomes, or heightened through vulnerabilities that pile up to increase the potential for negative outcomes. However, significant risk, protection, vulnerability, and outcomes (or adaptation) occur within the context of family meanings, family adaptive systems (emotional systems, control systems, identity systems, maintenance systems, stress-response systems) in the particular family, and broader ecosystems.

Resilience as a concept has been heavily studied on the individual level in children who have experienced significant stress or adversities. Family resilience is another level of resilience that is related to complex relationships and environmental factors. Fields that have utilized resilience research include psychology sociology, education, psychiatry and nursing. The concept of resilience is attractive to many different health related fields because of all that remains unknown about the process, as well as the potential for reducing or preventing adverse outcomes due to significant experiences with adversity. Once thought of as simply a personality trait, resilience has become known as a dynamic process with many related factors that can change throughout an individual's life. Since resilience is also related to experience to stressors and ultimately results in healthy coping, connections can be made with resilience literature, military family literature, and other stress/coping literature

== Difference with individual resilience ==
Family and individual resilience factors are not always the same. Family factors consist of stress management, emotion regulation skills, collaborative goal setting and problem solving. In contrast, individual factors that foster resilience include flexibility, use of social support, rebounding, high expectations, humor, self-efficacy, and self-esteem. While few valid and reliable measures exist to measure resilience or family resilience specifically, much recent work has focused on measuring these attributes of resilient families.

Family resilience is a strengths-oriented approach that tends to emphasize positive outcomes at the overall family system level, within family systems, in individual family members, and in the family-ecosystem fit and recognize the subjective meanings families bring to understanding risk, protection, and adaptation.

== Measuring ==
According to Henry et al. when examining family resilience is critical to be aware of some key issues: (a) significant risk must be present for resilience to occur, (b) other vulnerabilities (e.g., chronic illness, addiction, poor conflict management or communication beyond the focal risk may "pile-up" to present additional challenges; c) protection (factors or processes of resilience) must be distinguished from outcomes (short or long term indicators of resilience), (d) family situational meanings (how a family collectively perceives the risk, protection, and vulnerabilities) interact with risk, vulnerabilities, protection, and outcomes, (e) these all occur within family adaptive systems (patterns of interaction within families described as meaning systems, control systems, emotion systems, maintenance systems, stress-response systems) and ecosystems. Thus, assessing resilience requires consideration of which component(s) the researcher is addressing. Further, measurement can occur at the level of the family-ecosystem (e.g., school-family, healthcare-family), overall family system, in family subsystems (e.g., couple relationships, sibling relationships, parent-child relationship, grandparent-grandchild relationship). Once the researcher clarifies which level(s) upon which they wish to focus, measures can be identified at the appropriate level.

The problem with a nebulous definition of family resilience is that it is difficult to measure without a concrete definition. Specific measurement tools of resilience include the Family Strengths and Resilience Scale, Connor-Davidson Resilience Scale, the Resilience Scale and other self-report measures such as Brief Symptom Inventory, Child Behavior Checklist, Child Depression Inventory, and Mental Health Inventories have been most commonly used.

One can also measure all of the attributes and antecedents of family resilience individually to attempt to capture what it means to be resilient at a certain phase of a family developmental cycle. Protective factors that can be quantitatively measured include: celebrations, hardiness, time together, routines, traditions, communication, financial management, and health. These factors have been most important when starting to understand the protective factors of resilience, versus the recovery factors, which are employed when the crisis or challenge has already occurred and the family needs to adapt. Recovery factors include: coping, social support, family support, esteem building, optimism, recreation, control, organization, flexibility, and hope. These factors are dependent upon the type of family that utilizes them and the need for certain factors depending upon the type of stressor (e.g. normative or non-normative). In short, it is difficult to measure family resilience.

Card and Barnett (2015) discuss four key methodological issues in researching individual and family resilience: psychometric properties (reliability, validity, measurement equivalence), causality in the absence of experimental research, contrasting variable centered and person centered approaches, and the multilevel nature of family resilience.

== Family resilience prevention and intervention ==
Professionals who work with families may employ a variety of educational, therapeutic, or community-based approaches to helping protect families against adversity or facilitate the abilities of families to mobilize their strengths or gain new resources to successfully rebound from adversity (i.e., demonstrate resilience). Examples of such approaches are to inoculate against risk (or expose families to low levels of risk in preparation for potential greater risks), reducing risk, increasing resources, or changing meanings to make them more manageable, according to Henry et a. (2015).

Disability within a family critically affects each family members life. People with disabilities may encounter societal, medical, environmental, physical, and attitudinal barriers. These barriers can have the ability to put these individuals and their families in the face of adversity. Family functioning is also key in identifying basic elements in resilience, including such processes as cohesion, flexibility, open communication, problem-solving, and an affirming belief system. In addition, in order for families to frame the stress and uncertainty of having a child with a disability as a challenge that provides opportunities for finding resilience and meaning finding the right resources and professionals is essential. When a family who is facing adversity is surrounded by a community who lack in responding to hardships they are bound to family disruption. This proves that as family adversities become more challenging and difficult, the availability of community resources and a family's outreach to use them are essential. This may include resources like providing financial security, practical assistance, social support, a basic sense of connectedness through kin and friendship networks, and religious or other group affiliations.

== In military families ==
Recent literature has focused on identifying healthy coping and adaptation in military families. With the current wars across the world, more military members are being deployed and are struggling with various issues such as: mental illness, substance abuse, difficulty with transitions, changes in roles, and ensuring their family is safe and healthy. The families of these military members are not immune to these stressors. The stress associated with the military can lead to depression if adequate coping mechanisms are not employed, or if the family does not possess the needed support or strength to adapt to stressors.

The Department of Defense has collaborated with positive psychology scientists to create the Comprehensive Soldier Fitness program for members of the Army. More recently, the Family Skills Component of this program has been released for use by family members in the military. New military, government, and public health initiatives are focused on fostering and promoting resilience in the military family overall. Initial results from pilot studies show that those who are resilient can better cope with stressors and are less likely to suffer from depression or alcohol use.

The Comprehensive Soldier Fitness program in the U.S. Army is the first of its kind. With input from the positive psychology field, a program to increase the physical and psychological health of service members was implemented in 2009. The Family Skills Component of this program is meant to assist military spouses and family members to also increase their levels of resilience.

Additionally to this program, there is also a project called Families OverComing Under Stress (FOCUS). This project was created by a University of California, Los Angeles-Harvard intervention development team at a Marine Corps Base, Camp Pendleton. The program was created as a large-scale demonstration program for the US Marine Corps and US Navy. Essentially FOCUS was created to supply education and skills training designed to aid with coping and deployment-related experiences for military parents and children. Within this program family members of those in the military build a support network with each other by communicating each of their deployment-related experiences. This understanding is from each other aids in supporting the family resiliency processes. Results report an improved understanding of deployment and combat stress, improved family skills like communication, emotional regulation, family goal setting, and stress management. A 2012 American Journal of Public Health study of 331 families who participated in the original military FOCUS program shows it significantly improves children's behavior and family functioning and reduces anxiety and depression among all family members

== See also ==
- Psychological resilience
- Comprehensive Soldier Fitness
- Stress management
- Stress (biology)
- Coping (psychology)
- Adaptation
- Positive psychology
