= Brain of Albert Einstein =

Preserved brain of the scientist

Einstein's brain was preserved after his death in 1955, but this fact was not revealed until 1978.

The brain of Albert Einstein has been a subject of much research and speculation. Albert Einstein's brain was removed shortly after his death, even though he wished for it to not be removed: he wanted his ashes to be spread in secret. His apparent regularities or irregularities in the brain have been used to support various ideas about correlations in neuroanatomy with general or mathematical intelligence. Studies have suggested an increased number of glial cells in Einstein's brain.

== Fate of the brain ==
Einstein's autopsy was conducted in the lab of Thomas Stoltz Harvey. Shortly after Einstein died in 1955, Harvey removed and weighed the brain at 1230 g. Harvey then took the brain to a lab at the University of Pennsylvania where he dissected it into several pieces. He kept some of the pieces to himself while others were given to leading pathologists. He hoped that cytoarchitectonics, the study of brain cells under a microscope, would reveal useful information. Harvey injected 50% formalin through the internal carotid arteries and afterward suspended the intact brain in 10% formalin. He also photographed the brain from many angles.

Harvey dissected the brain into about 240 blocks (each about 1 cm^{3}) and encased the segments in a plastic-like material called collodion. Harvey also removed Einstein's eyes. He gave them to Henry Abrams, Einstein's ophthalmologist.

Whether or not Einstein's brain was preserved with his prior consent is a matter of dispute. Ronald Clark's 1979 biography of Einstein states "he had insisted that his brain should be used for research and that he be cremated." More recent research has suggested that the brain was removed and preserved without the permission of either Einstein or his close relatives. Hans Albert Einstein, the physicist's elder son, endorsed the removal after the event. However, he insisted that his father's brain should be used only for research to be published in scientific journals of high standing.

In 1978, Einstein's brain was rediscovered in Harvey's possession by journalist Steven Levy. Its sections had been preserved in alcohol in two large mason jars within a cider box for over twenty years.

The brain was driven across the mainland United States and to Hamilton, Ontario, accompanied by Harvey. Journalist and chauffeur Michael Paterniti wrote about some of the journeying that took place in 1997.

In 2010, Harvey's heirs transferred all of his holdings constituting the remains of Einstein's brain to the National Museum of Health and Medicine. This included fourteen photographs of the whole brain prior to sectioning, never before revealed to the public.

Forty-six small portions of Einstein's brain were acquired by the Mütter Museum in Philadelphia. In 2013, segments of the brain went on exhibit in the museum's permanent galleries. The exhibit featured thin slices of Einstein's brain, mounted on microscope slides.

== Scientific studies ==
A study found that certain regions of his brain, such as the prefrontal cortex and parietal lobes, were unusually well-developed and densely packed with neurons. These areas are associated with abstract thinking, mathematical skills, and spatial reasoning. Additionally, the absence of a typical groove called the "Sylvian fissure" in his brain may have allowed for better communication between different brain regions.

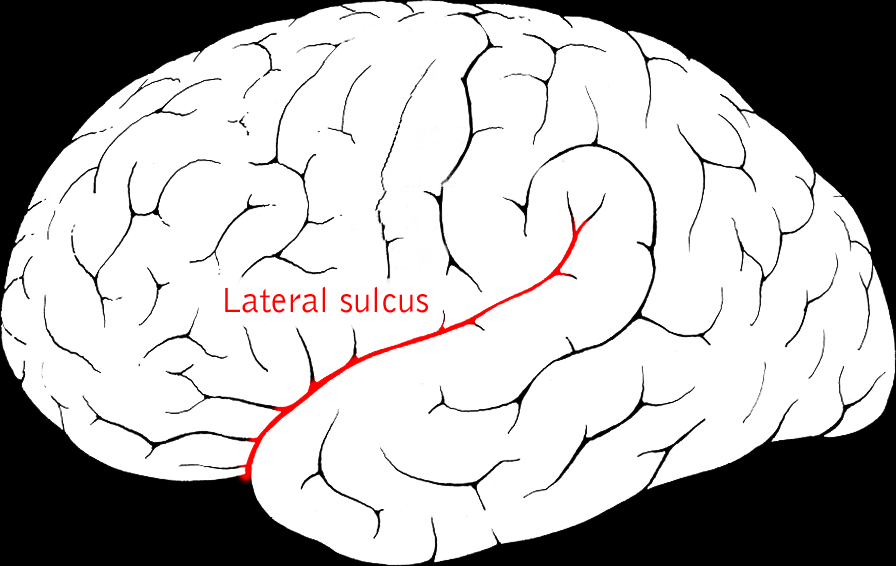
The lateral sulcus (Sylvian fissure) in a normal brain. In Einstein's brain, this was truncated.

=== Autopsy ===
Harvey had reported that Einstein had no parietal operculum in either hemisphere, but this finding has been disputed. In 1999, further analysis by a team at McMaster University in Hamilton, Ontario revealed that his parietal operculum region in the inferior frontal gyrus in the frontal lobe of the brain was vacant. The lateral sulcus (Sylvian fissure) was truncated. Researchers at McMaster University speculated that the vacancy may have enabled neurons in this part of his brain to communicate better. "This unusual brain anatomy...[missing part of the Sylvian fissure]... may explain why Einstein thought the way he did," said Professor Sandra Witelson who led the research published in The Lancet. This study was based on photographs of the whole brain made at autopsy in 1955 by Harvey and not a direct examination of the brain. Einstein himself claimed that he thought visually rather than verbally. Professor Laurie Hall of Cambridge University, commenting on the study, said, "To say there is a definite link is one bridge too far, at the moment. So far, the case isn't proven. But magnetic resonance and other new technologies are allowing us to start to probe those very questions."

=== Glial cells ===
In the 1980s, University of California, Berkeley professor Marian Diamond received four sections of the cortical association regions of the superior prefrontal and inferior parietal lobes in the right and left hemispheres of Albert Einstein's brain from Thomas Harvey. In 1984, Marian Diamond and her associates were the first ever to publish research on the brain of Albert Einstein. She compared the ratio of glial cells in Einstein's brain with that of the preserved brains of 11 other males. (Glial cells provide support and nutrition in the brain, form myelin, and participate in signal transmission, and are the other integral component of the brain, besides the neurons.) Dr. Diamond's laboratory made thin sections of Einstein's brain, each 6 micrometers thick. They then used a microscope to count the cells.

Einstein's brain had more glial cells relative to neurons in all areas studied, but only in the left inferior parietal area was the difference statistically significant. This area is part of the association cortex, regions of the brain responsible for incorporating and synthesizing information from multiple other brain regions. A stimulating environment can increase the proportion of glial cells and the high ratio could possibly result from Einstein's life studying stimulating scientific problems.

The limitation that Diamond admits in her study is that she had only one Einstein to compare with 11 brains of normal intelligence individuals. S. S. Kantha of the Osaka Bioscience Institute criticized Diamond's study, as did Terence Hines of Pace University. Other issues related to Diamond's study point out glial cells continue dividing as a person ages and although Einstein's brain was 76, it was compared to brains that averaged 64 in age (eleven male brains, 47–80 years of age). Diamond in her landmark study "On the Brain of a Scientist: Albert Einstein" noted that the 11 male individuals whose brains were used in her control base had died from nonneurologically related diseases. She also noted that "Chronological age is not necessarily a useful indicator in measuring biological systems. Environmental factors also play a strong role in modifying the conditions of the organism. One major problem in dealing with human specimens is that they do not come from controlled environments."

=== Hippocampus ===
Dr. Dahlia Zaidel of the University of California, Los Angeles, examined two slices of Albert Einstein's brain containing the hippocampus in 2001. The hippocampus is a subcortical brain structure that plays an important role in learning and memory. The neurons on the left side of the hippocampus were found to be significantly larger than those on the right, and when compared with normal brain slices of the same area in ordinary people, there was only minimal, inconsistent asymmetry in this area. "The larger neurons in the left hippocampus, Zaidel noted, imply that Einstein's left brain may have had stronger nerve cell connections between the hippocampus and another part of the brain called the neocortex than his right. The neocortex is where detailed, logical, analytical and innovative thinking takes place, Zaidel noted in a prepared statement."

=== Stronger connection between brain hemispheres ===
A study published in the journal Brain in September 2013 analyzed Einstein's corpus callosum, a large bundle of fibers that connects the two cerebral hemispheres and facilitates interhemispheric communication in the brain, using a novel technique that allowed for a higher resolution measurement of the fiber thickness. Einstein's corpus callosum was compared to two sample groups: 15 brains of elderly people and 52 brains from people aged 26. Einstein was 26 in 1905, his Annus Mirabilis (Miracle Year). The findings show that Einstein had more extensive connections between certain parts of his cerebral hemispheres compared to both younger and older control group brains.

=== Recovered photographs ===
A study, "The cerebral cortex of Albert Einstein: a description and preliminary analysis of unpublished photographs", was published on November 16, 2012, in the journal Brain. Dean Falk, an evolutionary anthropologist at Florida State University, led the study - which analyzed 14 recently discovered photographs - and described the brain: "Although the overall size and asymmetrical shape of Einstein's brain were normal, the prefrontal, somatosensory, primary motor, parietal, temporal and occipital cortices were extraordinary." There was a fourth ridge (apart from the three normal people have) in Einstein's mid-frontal lobe involved in making plans and working memory. The parietal lobes were markedly asymmetrical and a feature in Einstein's primary motor cortex may have been associated with his musical ability.

Another study led by Shanghai-based East China Normal University's Department of Physics, "The Corpus Callosum of Albert Einstein's Brain: Another Clue to His High Intelligence", published in the journal Brain on September 24, 2013, showed a new technique to conduct the study, which is the first to detail Einstein's corpus callosum, the brain's largest bundle of fibers that connects the two cerebral hemispheres and facilitates interhemispheric communication. Einstein's corpus callosum was thicker than those in control groups, possibly indicating better cooperation between the hemispheres. Scientists currently cannot tell how far the unusual features above were innate or how far they were due to Einstein's devoting his life to higher thought.

=== Criticism ===
Publication bias may have influenced published results, which means that results showing differences between Einstein's brain and other brains tend to get published while results showing that in many respects Einstein's brain was like other brains tend to be neglected. Researchers knew which brain was Einstein's and which were controls, allowing possible conscious or unconscious bias and preventing impartial research.

Neurologist Terence Hines of Pace University is strongly critical of the studies and has stated that they are flawed. Hines maintains that all human brains are unique and different from others in some ways. Therefore, assuming unique features in Einstein's brain were connected with his genius, in Hines' opinion, goes beyond the evidence. He argues further that correlating unusual brain features with any characteristic requires studying many brains with those features, and says that scanning the brains of many very capable scientists would be better research than investigating the brains of just one or two geniuses.

== Brains of other high profile figures ==
Preserving the brains of geniuses was not a new phenomenon—another brain to be preserved and discussed in a similar manner was that of the German mathematician Carl Friedrich Gauss almost a hundred years earlier. His brain was studied by Rudolf Wagner who found its weight to be 1,492 grams and the cerebral area equal to 219,588 square millimeters. Also found were highly developed convolutions, which was suggested as the explanation of his genius. Other brains that were removed and studied include those of Vladimir Lenin, the mathematician Sofia Kovalevskaya, and the Native American Ishi. The brain of Edward H. Rulloff, a noted philologist and criminal, was removed after his death in 1871; in 1972, it was still the second largest brain on record.

== TV and film reporting ==
- Relics: Einstein's Brain, 1994 documentary by Kevin Hull

The story of Harvey's theft of Einstein's brain and its subsequent study was explained in an episode of the Science Channel show Dark Matters: Twisted But True (a series which explores the darker side of scientific discovery and experimentation) that September 7, 2011. The program segment "The Secrets of Einstein's Brain" reran on the History Channel on June 4, 2016.

- The Man Who Stole Einstein's Brain, 2023 documentary by Michelle Shephard that premiered at the 2023 Hot Docs Festival
