= Froma Walsh =

Clinical Psychologist and family therapist

- Born: Kenosha, Wisconsin
- Education: University of California, Berkeley, Smith College, University of Chicago
- Occupations: Clinical Psychologist and Professor Emerita
- Known for: Family resilience, family strengths, family processes, loss in families, gender disparities

Froma Walsh (born 1942) is an American clinical psychologist and family therapist. She is the co-founder and co-director of the Chicago Center for Family Health and the Mose and Sylvia Firestone Professor Emerita at the University of Chicago.

== Early life and education ==
Walsh grew up in Kenosha, Wisconsin and Burbank, California. She received her BA in Psychology at the University of California, Berkeley (1960-1964), where she was involved in primate studies and was worked alongside Mark Rosenzweig (psychologist) and Marian Diamond on enriched environments in neuroplasticity. She served as a Peace Corps Volunteer in Morocco (1964–66), in the women's center (foyers feminins) and in psychological services for maladapted youth. She received an MSW at Smith College, Northampton, MA, with clinical practica at the Yale University Child Study Center and at the department of psychiatry (1968-1970). She earned her PhD in Human Development and Behavioral Sciences at the University of Chicago (1977) and was influenced by the work of Bertram Cohler and Mihaly Csikszentmihalyi on positive life course development.

== Career ==
In 1971 Walsh was the Family Studies Coordinator for a Schizophrenia Research Program in Chicago, which was sponsored by the National Institute of Mental Health. She brought a family systems orientation in contrast to prevailing mother-blaming theories of mental illness in the field of psychiatry. She expanded her studies from families of psychiatric patients to a broad community sample to understand the diversity, challenges, and strengths in family life. In 1978, Walsh joined the faculty of the Family Institute of Chicago, Northwestern University as Associate Professor of Psychiatry. From 1982 until retirement, she was on the tenured faculty at the University of Chicago in the School of Social Service Administration and the Department of Psychiatry, Pritzker School of Medicine, and was appointed the Mose and Sylvia Firestone Professor. Additionally, she and John Rolland co-founded the university-affiliated Chicago Center for Family Health (1991-current). Under their co-direction, the award-winning institute has provided resilience-oriented family therapy training and community consultation, with a core commitment to diverse and underserved families.

== Major contributions ==
Walsh has focussed much of her work on family resilience. Her research-informed family resilience framework has helped to shape theory, research, and practice with individuals, families, and communities facing adversity Over 30 years, she and her CCFH colleagues have developed programs building family resilience with a range of adverse situations: complicated bereavement; chronic illness/disability; relational trauma; divorce; job loss/unemployment; LGBTQ stigma; and at-risk youth. She has conducted international training and consultation to develop local capacities to strengthen families facing adversity, from conditions of poverty to major disasters, refugee displacement, and war-related strife

She has refocused psychotherapy from family deficits to family strengths, deconstructing myths of "the normal family." She addresses the diversity, challenges, and resilience of families in the context of societal and global transformations. Informed by the research evidence that children and families can thrive in diverse relational structures, she identified key family processes and socio-cultural influences in risk and resilience.

In collaboration with Monica McGoldrick, Walsh developed an approach to address complicated bereavement in families. She has advanced the use of broadly inclusive multi-faith perspectives in clinical practice, in her edited book, Spiritual Resources in Family Therapy. To bring attention to gender disparities in families and psychotherapy, she and colleagues Monica McGoldrick and Carol Anderson organized the Stonehenge Conferences that took place between 1984-1986. They also produced the edited book, Women in Families: A Framework for Family Therapy. she has also produced scholarship on the relational significance of companion animals and their benefits in health and wellbeing; role in family dynamics; and therapeutic benefits.

== Recognition ==
- President of American Family Therapy Academy.
- Editor of Journal of Marital and Family Therapy.
- Presidential Citation for Outstanding Career of the American Psychological Association.
- Distinguished Contribution to Family Therapy Theory and Practice Award of the American Family Therapy Academy
- Distinguished Contributions in Marriage and Family Therapy Award of the American Association for Marriage and Family Therapy.
- Blanch Ittleson Award for Distinguished Career of the American Orthopsychiatric Association.

== Books ==
- Normal Family Processes (1982)
  - Normal Family Processes: Growing Diversity and Complexity (2016)
- Women in Families: A Framework for Family Therapy - McGoldrick, M., Anderson, C. (1989)
- Living Beyond Loss: Death in the Family -McGoldrick, M. (1991, 2004)
- The Concept of Family Resilience: Crisis and Challenge (1996)
- Strengthening Family Resilience (1998, 2016)
- Spiritual Resources in Family Therapy (1999, 2009)
- Family Resilience: A Framework for Clinical Practice (2003)
- Traumatic Loss and Major Disasters: Strengthening Family and Community Resilience (2007)
- Human-Animal Bonds I: The Relational Significance of Companion Animals (2009)
- Human-Animal Bonds II: The Role of Pets in Family Systems and Family Therapy (2009)
- Applying a Family Resilience Framework in Training, Practice, and Research: Mastering the Art of the Possible (2016)
- A Family Developmental Framework: Challenges and Resilience Across the Life Cycle (2016)
