= Comprehensive Soldier and Family Fitness =

Comprehensive Soldier & Family Fitness logo.

Comprehensive Soldier Fitness (CSF) was established in August 2008 by then-Chief of Staff of the United States Army, General George W. Casey, Jr., in an effort to address the challenges being faced due to multiple deployments required by persistent conflicts in Iraq and Afghanistan. Instead of focusing only on treatment after the issues arose, Casey wanted to also provide preventative measures to the soldiers, their families and Army civilians to make them stronger on the front end. CSF Resilience Training was created to give these individuals the life skills needed to better cope with adversity and bounce back stronger from these challenges. Renamed in October 2012 as Comprehensive Soldier and Family Fitness (CSF2), was designed to build resilience and enhance performance of the Army family—soldiers, their families, and Army civilians. Comprehensive Soldier Fitness is not a treatment program in response to adverse psychological conditions. CSF2 has three main components: online self-development, training, and metrics and evaluation. According to Army Regulation 350–53, to be published December 2013, the following are the Vision, Mission and components of CSF2:

== Vision ==
A Total Army team of physically healthy and psychologically strong soldiers, families and Army civilians whose resilience and total fitness enables them to thrive in the military and civilian sector and to meet a wide range of operational demands.

== Mission ==
Execute the Comprehensive Soldier and Family Fitness (CSF2) program, as part of the U.S. Army Ready and Resilient Campaign Plan, in order to increase the physical and psychological health, resilience and performance of Soldiers, Families and Army Civilians.

== Components ==
In addition to live training at the unit level and in Army school houses, CSF2 provides tools to Soldiers, Family members and Army Civilians so that they can build resilience at their own pace and form their own social networks based on individual needs and preferences.

=== Online Self-Development ===
Online self-development begins when soldiers, family members and Army civilians take the Global Assessment Tool (GAT), which is a survey for individuals to confidentially assess their psychological health based on four dimensions of strength: emotional, social, spiritual, and family. Upon completing the survey, the individual receives a score for each dimension. Users also receive their RealAge® and Performance Triad score. RealAge® is a metric that looks at responses to the GAT 2.0 and tells users their biological age compared to their calendar age. The Performance Triad looks at the three main areas that affect mental and physical performance: sleep, activity, and nutrition. The user then enters an online interactive self-development site called ArmyFit™ that enables soldiers, family members and Army civilians to access experts in each of five dimensions of resilience (physical fitness is added as a dimension), communicate with each other, set personal goals and earn recognition badges as those goals are achieved. It is located within the .mil environment and allow users to set their own level of confidentiality. ArmyFit™ serves as the portal to comprehensive resilience/performance modules (CRMs). CRMs are web-based, self-development training videos that teach skills to support each of the dimensions of resilience. Individuals taking the GAT receive recommendations on specific CRMs to view based on their individual scores in each dimension. They are typically around 15 minutes, but that varies with the user, as many are scenario-based and self-paced. Topics range from "blended families" and "building your teen’s resilience" to "effective communication" and "goal setting".

=== Training ===
The training component consists of creating a cadre of master resilience trainers (MRTs), performance enhancement and institutional resilience training. MRTs are graduates of an intensive 10-day course. Installation commanders select soldiers, Army spouses (statutory volunteers), and Department of the Army civilians to receive this training. They are the only personnel authorized to conduct formal resilience training to members of the Army family. They return to their unit (or installation Army Community Services or family readiness group in the case of spouses) to provide the training to other soldiers, spouses and Army civilians. The Army has trained over 33,000 MRTs since the program graduated its first class in 2009. The Army plans to train 7,100 new MRTs per year in order to reach its goal of one MRT per company Army-wide. Performance Enhancement provides soldiers, family members and DA civilians with the mental and emotional skills to strengthen their minds and perform at their best. It consists of six mental skills; mental skills foundations, building confidence, attention control, energy management, goal setting and integrating imagery. Performance enhancement skills are taught by CSF2 master resilience trainer performance experts (MRT-PEs) based out of 16 CSF2 training centers located on installations around the nation. Two of the skills are now included in MRT Training. Performance enhancement training has been used to elevate performance in Soldiers' combat life-saving skills, as preparation for Expert Field Medical Badge testing, preparing for Special Forces Selection, to prepare teams for Army-wide competitions including Best Ranger and Best Sapper and even culinary arts competitions. Institutional Resilience training is provided at every major level of the Army education system. This includes Basic Combat Training, the Advanced Leadership Course, the Senior Leader Course, the Pre-Command Course, the United States Army Sergeants Major Academy, the Reserve Officer Training Course and Officer Candidate School and at every level of Professional Military Education from the Warrior Leader Course, Warrant Officer Basic Course, Basic Officer Leadership Course B, through the Warrant Officer Senior Staff Course and the Army War College.

=== Metrics and evaluation ===
CSF2 constantly monitors its effectiveness and outcomes. It does this through scientific research performed by an Army research evaluation team, internal inspections of CSF2 implementation, and Army-wide resilience training unit status reporting (USR) requirements. The Deputy Secretary of the Army's Research Facilitation Team has performed and published four technical reports on the effectiveness of CSF2 resilience training. Highlights of these studies include the fact that Soldiers who received MRT-led resilience training reported higher levels of resilience and psychological health over time than Soldiers who did not receive the training. Also, units that received MRTs at the company level had 60 percent fewer diagnoses of drug & alcohol abuse and 13 percent fewer diagnoses of anxiety, depression, and Posttraumatic stress disorder compared to units that did not receive MRTs at the company level. The WRAIR Research Transition Office (RTO) performs ongoing program evaluation of CSF2 resilience training to determine whether instructors are training the material to standard. Finally, CSF2 measures compliance with MRT staffing requirement of one MRT per company/company-sized unit across all components of the Army and a training requirement that each company/company-sized Unit is trained on all MRT skills a minimum of once a year.

== New initiatives ==
CSF2 is constantly refining and improving the training and self-development tools it makes available to members of the Army family. Below are descriptions of CSF2's three most recent initiatives.

=== Executive resilience and performance course ===
Recognizing that no Army program can thrive in the absence of leadership buy-in, CSF2 has developed four, eight and 16-hour versions of MRT training to expose Army leadership to resilience, and performance enhancement. Each version provides an overview of CSF2, resilience training and performance enhancement training. The four-hour version includes four resilience skills, the eight-hour version includes five skills plus two foundational concepts, and the 16-hour version includes ten skills plus two foundational concepts.

=== Training support package ===
CSF2 has created a resilience skills training support package (TSP) for use by MRTs for both in-processing and ongoing resilience training of soldiers. It consists of a set of instructional materials reinforced by clips from CSF2's feature-length film, "Resilience". These packages will be available to all MRTs. It includes a standardized workbook, instructors guide, and a DVD of the CSF2-produced movie. It helps to further standardize training across the Force and provides MRTs with newly developed tools and resources.

=== Army spouse MRT training ===
Under Secretary of the Army Directive 2013–07, CSF2 has the goal of providing MRT training to enough Army spouses to achieve a level of one spouse per company Family Readiness Group. To date, CSF2 has trained dozens of Army spouses under a pilot program and is now mainstreaming spouse training. Spouses can receive the training at the discretion of installation commanders, and CSF2 is actively encouraging them to make seats available to spouses.

== Criticism ==
CSF2 has been subject to criticism, on its use of scientific evaluation and from activist organizations concerned with advancing religious freedom including atheism. They have also questioned the efficacy of CSF2's methodology.

=== Scientific evidence ===
The CSF2 program has been subject to criticism from religious liberty advocacy groups. These organizations have questioned spending tax dollars on a program that isn't fully supported by hard scientific evidence, and further questions whether the program was started in order to promote a certain type of religiosity.

=== Spiritual fitness ===
The U.S. Army has had religious "spiritual fitness" initiatives; however, these groups contend that the U.S. Army's spiritual fitness initiatives are now being promoted as though they were secular initiatives. The focus of the non-religious/non-spiritual Penn Resiliency Program, supported in part by Martin Seligman through the University of Pennsylvania Positive Psychology Center, was mostly on adolescent depression treatment, teaching cognitive-behavioral and social problem-solving skills to build resilience. However, more than a dozen controlled studies have shown that PRP has prevented elevated or clinically relevant levels of depression and anxiety symptoms for a range of populations, including parents and families. The program works through an emphasis on incorporating the skills into daily life, demonstrating a relevance to real-world situations. In response, CSF2 points out that its definition is focused on what builds the human spirit inclusive of the diversity of the force. According to Army Regulation 350–53, CSF2's definition of the spiritual dimension is: "Identifying one’s purpose, core values, beliefs, identity, and life vision define the spiritual dimension. These elements, which define the essence of a person, enable one to build inner strength, make meaning of experiences, behave ethically, persevere through challenges, and be resilient when faced with adversity. An individual’s spirituality draws upon personal, philosophical, psychological, and/or religious teachings or beliefs, and forms the basis of their character."

=== Spiritual fitness and GAT ===
These groups also contend that the GAT has five questions designated to measure spiritual fitness. Some atheists have complained that this test may discriminate against non-believers. Concerns were raised by members of the humanist and atheist community about the remedial training modules for a low score on the GAT's "spiritual fitness" component. One of these criticisms is that CSF2 distorts the meanings of "spirit," "spirituality," and "prayer" to appear secular. CSF2 responds that the user is provided the voluntary opportunity to view four Comprehensive Resilience Modules; Spiritual Support, Rituals, Making Meaning and Meditation, all are written to be inclusive of the diversity of the force, recognizing that every individual is going to define spiritual fitness differently.
