= Relics: Einstein's Brain =

Einstein's Brain
- Directed by: Kevin Hull
- Written by: Kevin Hull
- Produced by: BBC Films
- Starring: Kenji Sugimoto
- Release date: 1994
- Running time: 65 minutes
- Language: English

Einstein's Brain is a 1994 documentary by Kevin Hull following Japanese professor Kenji Sugimoto (1947-2006) in his search for Albert Einstein's brain. It is produced by BBC Films.

== Synopsis ==
This documentary is introduced by a set of titles informing the viewer that Albert Einstein's brain was extracted after his death in 1955 and that it was donated to the Princeton Medical Center. We then meet Kenji Sugimoto, professor of mathematics and science history at the Kindai University of Osaka, who describes what Einstein means to him: "Einstein teaches me about love as well as science. Passion, love and science. I love Albert Einstein."

He embarks on a pilgrimage to Princeton to find the legendary cerebrum. Once there, he learns that the brain has been misplaced, and the film documents his subsequent travels across the United States to recover it. The last person known to handle the item is Thomas Stoltz Harvey, a man who proves difficult to find. One lead sends Sugimoto to the Albert Einstein College of Medicine in New York City, where a former associate of Harvey's, Dr. Harry Zimmerman, informs him that Harvey is dead.

Sugimoto next tracks down Einstein's granddaughter by adoption, Evelyn Einstein. She tells him she has reason to believe she actually is biologically related to Einstein, and has been in dialogue with an institute to compare her DNA to that of the late scientist's brain. The brain sample used for this was sent from Harvey's residence in Lawrence, Kansas, giving Sugimoto a possible lead to the brain's current whereabouts.

Once in Kansas, it appears Zimmerman was misinformed; Thomas Harvey is still very much alive. Sugimoto learns Harvey's whereabouts from William S. Burroughs, the famous beat generation author, who is living in Lawrence. Sugimoto finally finds the brain, which is stored in three jars in a closet, and even acquires a small sample to bring back to Japan. He celebrates by singing karaoke in a local bar, and closes the documentary with another reflection: "I am born in Nagasaki two years after bomb. Einstein is made responsible for the bomb, but I do not blame him. I still love Albert Einstein."

== The question of veracity ==
Because of its somewhat absurd premise and execution, Einstein's Brain's veracity has often been questioned. The notion of a brain of such fame being misplaced and subsequently found by an eccentric Japanese professor has by many been found too outrageous to be true, but aside from the regular narrativization of material found in documentaries, very little actually indicates forgery.

Kai Michel's article " Wo ist Einsteins Denkorgan?" ("Where is Einstein's Brain?"), published by Die Zeit in December 2004, shows just how easy it is to assume the film is a forgery. This article revolves around professor Michael Hagner of ETH Zurich, who after showing a group of students the film in question informs them that this is all fiction and that Kenji Sugimoto is a character. But after a phone call to a colleague he is informed that Sugimoto in fact is real, and that truth in fact is stranger than fiction. Or as Hagner himself puts it, "Nichts ist absurder als die Realität" (″Nothing is more absurd than reality itself″).

The documentary is lent further credibility by Michael Paterniti's 2000 book Driving Mr. Albert: A Trip Across America With Einstein's Brain, where the author tells the story of how he chauffeured Dr. Harvey across the US to deliver the brain to Evelyn Einstein. His path crosses with several persons who appeared in Einstein's Brain, including director Kevin Hull and Evelyn Einstein, and at one point he even travels to Japan and meets Sugimoto, who proudly shows off his brain sample and invites him out to a night of karaoke. If the story of Sugimoto and Harvey is a hoax, it is an elaborate one. Prof. Sugimoto died on October 19, 2006, in Osaka, Japan.

== See also ==
- Albert Einstein's brain
