= Arnold Scheibel =

American neuroscientist

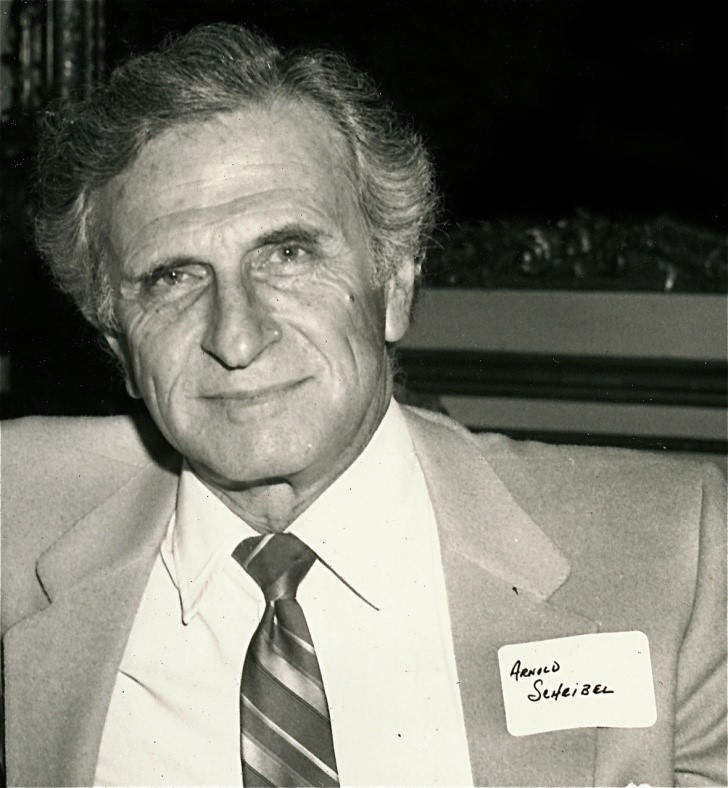
- Born: January 18, 1923
- Died: April 3, 2017 (aged 94); Oakland, California, U.S.
- Education: Columbia University (BA, MD)
- Occupations: Neuroscientist, professor
- Organization: Director of Brain Research Institute at UCLA
- Spouses: Mila Scheibel, Marian Diamond

Arnold Bernard Scheibel (January 18, 1923 – April 3, 2017) was an American neuroscientist, professor of psychiatry and neuroanatomy, and the former director of the Brain Research Institute at the University of California, Los Angeles. He is well known for his research regarding the anatomy of the spinal cord, brain stem, and cerebral cortex. He introduced the concept of modular organization in the nervous system. His Golgi studies of human brain tissue extended the knowledge about the nature of neuronal changes in senile brain disease and in schizophrenia. He demonstrated the correlations between human cognitive activity and structural change, and also emphasized the role of plasticity in the living reactive brain."

== Early years ==
Scheibel was the only son of Ethel and William Scheibel. He was born on January 18, 1923, and raised in Manhattan and the Bronx. His mother, Ethel, was from old southern Germany, while his father, William, was from the old Austria-Hungary. When Scheibel was 5 years old, his aunt died in childbirth, leaving behind her newborn son, Milton, to be raised by his parents. His cousin Milton became "in every sense [his] brother". Milton became an economist and worked in Washington as executive assistant secretary for defense under several administrations. Although his father was an advertising and sales manager, Scheibel credits his father for his artistic ability, which was crucial to his many detailed drawings of neuropil. Although his mother did not complete a formal education, she was an accomplished pianist as well as an avid reader. Although his parents had many differences, they both emphasized the importance of education for their children. Being raised as a "child of the depression", his conservative spending habits carried on throughout life.

One of his favorite books as a child was "The Mysterious Universe by Sir James Jeans, and Compton's Pictured Encyclopedia was his "bible" for several years. Growing up, outdoor sports were not encouraged by his parents, who believed that "play was at best a slightly disreputable way of taking a necessary break from meaningful work". Given this upbringing, his graduation from Columbia College hinged upon him learning to swim (it was a requirement at the time).

Scheibel won a scholarship to Horace Mann School, but did not enjoy high school biology classes. As a liberal arts major at Columbia College, he took a short science sequence. It was here that he began to realize that "the study of living things was more interesting than [he] could have guessed".

When the attack on Pearl Harbor occurred in 1941, Scheibel and his classmates became more concerned with how their future careers could be relevant to the war effort (they did not know how long it would drag on). Medicine seemed to him to be the best way to combine his burgeoning interest in biology with a career that would be useful. In April 1943, Scheibel was accepted at Columbia University's College of Physicians and Surgeons.

== Medical school ==
After starting medical school at Columbia University College of Physicians and Surgeons, Scheibel and his classmates were given the opportunity to join the Army or Navy in exchange for financial assistance for their schooling. Scheibel accepted the offer, which required a minimum of 2 years of service following his medical training.

Unsatisfied with his school's coverage of neurology due to the lack of physicians for education caused by the demands of World War II, Scheibel, ironically, decided he would not pursue a specialty involving any "structures above the neck." While learning clinical medicine under renowned faculty, he noticed the physicians seemed "remote and unapproachable and far from representing the human component that [he] expected." This memory from his training influenced how Scheibel would treat patients and students in the future.

He did a 15-month internship at the old Mount Sinai Hospital in New York. It was here that he was exposed to the work done by psychoanalytically trained psychiatrists, and he reported it to be "an eye opening experience" that led him to consider psychiatry instead of cardiology as his future specialty. In June 1947, he started residency at the new Psychiatry Service at Barnes and McMillan Hospitals of Washington University in St. Louis, and his "pattern of life changed forever".

== Life in San Antonio ==
Scheibel did two years of active service with the United States Army Medical Corps at Brooke General Hospital in San Antonio. It was here where he met and married his first wife Mila.

In San Antonio, he had a foray into child psychiatry when he was unexpectedly appointed as the medical officer in charge of the first child guidance clinic in an army general hospital setting. Although he had no prior experience of the field, by the time he left Texas, he became a local authority on the subject. He was even asked by the Hogg Foundation to open a child guidance clinic in Austin, but he declined.

But, he continued to have an uneasy feeling that what he was doing was not quite present or fulfilled. He felt that he was missing something, and it was not until after an introduction to Warren McCulloch in Chicago that his excitement was renewed.

== Life in Chicago ==
In June 1950, Arne and Mila Scheibel set out for Chicago to work at Warren Mculloch's laboratory at Illinois Psychiatric Institute. It was here where he was introduced to the Golgi technique and thus developed an interest in neurohistology.

After Horace Magoun became the chair of anatomy at UCLA school of medicine, he left behind new ideas of the role of the reticular core, as control of cortical excitability as well as spinal mechanisms. But, little was known about its internal structure and connections. Thus for his first neurophysiological research project, Scheibel looked at the brainstem reticular formation using Golgi staining. He thought of this method as a "kind of melding of science and art", and "he knew of no excitement and satisfaction such as that offered by the Golgi method". It is then no surprise that he recalled this time as "the most enjoyable of [his] research years".

Since the Golgi method rapidly loses its sensitivity with the development with myelin, it is most effective in young animal tissue. Accordingly, most of Scheibel's Golgi stains were done with the brains of animals from 10 days to 2 weeks of life.

Gerhard Von Bonin and Percival Bailey were among the distinguished faculty working at Illinois Neuropsychiatric Institute at the time.

In their first year in Chicago, his wife, Mila, was diagnosed with poliomyelitis, which made it advisable for them to relocate to warmer climates.

== Life in Memphis ==
At the University of Tennessee Medical Center at Memphis, Scheibel secured a joint appointment at the departments of Psychiatry and Anatomy, and Mila and he were given their own laboratory. Scheibel spent his mornings working in the psychiatric ward, and spent his afternoons and evenings with Mila in the laboratory.

Their first paper together was on the cerebellar climbing fibers, describing a climbing fiber collateral to the large Golgi type II cell of the cerebellum, later coined the name "Scheibel collateral". These collaterals were also found to be extending to the stellate and basket cells, which expanded the influence of climbing fiber input to the inhibitory systems of the cerebellar cortex (Scheibel and Scheibel, 1954)

The second paper was on the inferior olive (Scheibel and Scheibel, 1955). This research was the basis for a Master of Science degree in anatomy from the University of Illinois awarded to him in 1953.

== Overseas ==
After being awarded a Guggenheim Fellowship in 1953, Scheibel went to Pisa to work with Giuseppe Moruzzi. His project, in collaboration with Amilcare Mollica, was to characterize inputs upon brainstem reticular cells using extracellular microelectrode recording techniques.

They discovered that each reticular neuron was the center of a widespread convergent pattern of idiosyncratic inputs, from ascending sensory systems, brainstem and cerebellar neurons, and cerebral cortex (Scheibel, Scheibel, Moruzzi, Mollica 1956).

== Life in California ==
At UCLA, Scheibel had joint appointments in the Departments of Neurobiology and Psychiatry.

After moving to UCLA, Scheibel began to establish the major features of reticular formation neurons. He was surprised at the axonal organization of large reticular cells, as some had bifurcating axons projecting both into the spinal cord as well as the diencephalon. Another surprise was the extreme degree of rostro-caudal compression of dendrite systems of reticular neurons (Scheibel and Scheibel, 1958). Since this organization resembled stacked poker chips, these discoveries eventually gave rise to the concept of modules in the nervous system.

Scheibel began to branch out from anatomy to physiology, and he used postnatal kittens as a model for investigating cortical and subcortical electrical rhythms. This research showed that individual reticular neurons quickly habituated to the familiar signal of repetitive stimulation. Scheibel could tell that this observation was not due to simple fatigue, since he also saw that a slight change to the input restored the original intensity and thus it was clear that these reticular neurons were excited by novelty and were turned off by the familiar (Scheibel and Scheibel, 1965a). Additionally, since the cyclical patterns between periods of sensitivity and insensitivity were mutually exclusive, Scheibel hypothesized that this might be a mechanism to prevent "individual neurons from being drawn increasingly into the input-output transactions of single neural domains" (Scheibel and Scheibel, 1965b). Due to Mila's health complications, this was the last study that they were able to share together.

In 1962, the Brain Research Institute at UCLA was created and with Mila's continued illness, Scheibel started doing all of his research at home, having a technician provide all the Golgi stained material.

=== Research on motor neurons ===
John Eccles hypothesized that Renshaw cells were short-axoned cells in the CNS that had an inhibitory role, but the Scheibels found that there were no such cells. The only possible candidates for the Renshaw role were collateral extensions of typical long-axoned projecting interneurons. Eccles was so troubled by this finding that he refused to speak to them ever again (Scheibel, 1971a).

By 1970, it was already well known that motor neuron soma were grouped muscle by muscle. Dendrites on the other hand, seemed to seek contact with dendrites from other nuclei as they streamed rostrally and caudally, so it was thought that dendrites were not bundled like the soma. However, through comparing samples of the reticular core of neonatal rats with those of adult rats, Scheibel found that although the dendrites of neonatal neurons are spine covered and project to the surrounded neuropil, the dendrites of mature neurons are spineless and are grouped into bundles just like motor neuron soma. Both the dramatic loss of spines as well as the reorganization into complex bundles indicated a fundamental change in how these dendrites were wired (Scheibel and Schiebel, 1973). Due to this demonstration of extraordinary plasticity, Scheibel later even hypothesized that these dendrite bundle complexes were a possible site of memory storage (Scheibel, 1975).

=== Research on the thalamus ===
The thalamus is made of twelve nuclei, and each has a different neuropil pattern. Thus, studying the thalamus presented "some of the most enjoyable and most challenging" problems Scheibel faced in his research. The landmark research published on the thalamus at the time included structural descriptions by Cajal (1911), connective studies by Walker (1938), O'Leary on the lateral geniculate (1940), and Herrick on the diencephalon of the tiger salamander (1948)

The thalamic intralaminar systems were already recognized as a neural basis of sleep-wakefulness, but histological studies done of them were minimal. Through thousands of Golgi stains, Scheibel was able to picture both the thalamocortical and corticothalamic tracts of the system.

The role of the nucleus reticularis thalami, referred to as "noyau grillage" by Cajal, was uncertain, until Scheibel's Golgi studies found that reticularis cell axons projected caudally into thalamic and mesencephalic neurons. Furthermore, it appeared that all thalamocortical and corticothalamic axons going down the nucleus reticularis made collateral connections with these cells. These connections were hypothesized to be the substrate for an inhibitory feedback control system between the thalamus and cortex.

Mila died on December 31, 1976.

=== Neurobiology of higher cognitive functions ===
In the 1970s, scientists began to take a greater interest into the effects and process of brain aging due to the growing aging population, resulting in the formation of the geriatric medicine specialty. Without prior experience in this area, Scheibel was able to effectively fill his gap in knowledge and further the field's understanding of human age-related cerebral cortical changes through careful examination of brain tissues (Scheibel et al., 1975). He, interestingly, noticed areas of new growth in regions of degenerated brain tissue from Alzheimer's patients that he had not observed elsewhere, calling this growth a "last gasp" of the dying cells (Scheibel and Tomiyasu, 1978). He continued to utilize Golgi techniques during his time at UCLA to study temporal lobe epilepsy, where he published his findings that supported the hypothesis that the disease was progressive (Scheibel, 1980)

Scheibel also spent time working as a psychiatric consultant for Camarillo State Hospital, at which he encountered primarily patients diagnosed with schizophrenia. He was able to obtain brain tissue samples from people with schizophrenia that were about to be discarded from the hospital, and he then focused his research around studying this disease using Golgi techniques. Despite new findings regarding diseased-cell morphology, Scheibel set his work aside to focus on the severe progression of Mila's illness. These findings were then presented several years later at the Society for Biological Psychiatry Meeting in Chicago (Scheibel and Kovelman, 1981). Prior to the presentation, in 1979, Scheibel was invited to give a talk at the University of California, Berkeley by Professor Marian Diamond, a scientist whom he had never met. Scheibel found it difficult to forget "Marian's dynamic personality and sensitivity," and as a result, their relationship grew for several years. They then married each other in 1982 and continued to work at their respective universities.

Scheibel and his colleagues also found that dendritic branching varied in length and complexity between Broca's area (and its corresponding region in the right hemisphere) and bilateral motor areas. Furthermore, they found that, in comparing the language region bilaterally, the left (Broca's area) contained neurons with longer dendrites. (Scheibel et al., 1985). These findings inspired further study into bilateral differences of the cortical hemispheres.

== Other aspects of academia ==
In 1987, Scheibel became the acting director of the Brain Research Institute at UCLA, followed by promotion to Director by 1990 until 1995. Prior to these appointments, Scheibel had already been a faculty member at UCLA, teaching his own graduate neuroscience courses as well as conducting research in his laboratory at the university. (http://www.bri.ucla.edu/about-us/past-directors/arnoldscheibel) He also established Project Brainstorm at UCLA, an outreach program that teaches neuroscience concepts to K-12 students across the Los Angeles Unified School District (LAUSD). Additionally, Scheibel created the Ethel Scheibel Endowed Chair in Neuroscience in the Department of Neurobiology at the David Geffen School of Medicine as well as the William Scheibel Endowed Chair in Neuroscience at the Brain Research Institute, each named after one of his parents. (https://newsroom.ucla.edu/dept/faculty/in-memoriam:-dr-arnold-scheibel-helped-shape-ucla-s-neuroscience-community ) Scheibel's passion for increasing exposure and accessibility to neuroscience even led him to create The Human Brain Coloring Book with Marian.

After Scheibel's active research ended, his commitment to teaching continued to flourish. Indeed, in 1997, he received the UCLA Distinguished Teaching Award. It is reported that "His lectures were captivating, guided tours through the nervous system: a stream of effortless narratives with fluid, blackboard illustrations serving as familiar landmarks. He could draw any brain structure, any cross section, at any angle with ease. A 2-hr lecture would be over before one realized it, and the students would have 20 pages of detailed notes in front of them. Lectures were linked together with the intricacy and fluidity of pastels blended on a canvas as Arne would reintroduce previous structures by referring to them as "our old friends."'

"A retrospective examination of Arne's teaching at UCLA estimated that he had taught over 700 graduate students, 1,200 undergraduates, 800 medical students, 200 psychiatric residents, and guided many research students."

He was a fellow of the Norwegian Academy of Science and Letters from 1983.

== Personal life ==
Scheibel died on April 3, 2017, in Oakland, California, at the age of 94. 3 months later, his wife Dr. Marian Diamond also died, at the age of 90.
