= Thomas Stoltz Harvey =

American pathologist (1912–2007)

- Harvey in 1955, on the day Albert Einstein died
- Born: October 10, 1912; Louisville, Kentucky, U.S.
- Died: April 5, 2007 (aged 94); Titusville, New Jersey, U.S.
- Education: Yale University
- Known for: Conducting the autopsy of Albert Einstein's brain and preserving it
- Scientific career
- Fields: Pathology

Thomas Stoltz Harvey (October 10, 1912 – April 5, 2007) was an American pathologist who conducted the autopsy on Albert Einstein in 1955. Harvey afterwards preserved Einstein's brain on the condition that it would be studied for scientific purposes.

== Early career ==
Harvey studied at Yale University as an undergraduate and later as a medical student under Dr. Harry Zimmerman. In his third year of medical school he contracted tuberculosis and was bedridden for the next year in a sanatorium, claiming it to be one of the biggest disappointments of his life.

== Autopsy of Albert Einstein ==
The autopsy was conducted at Princeton Hospital on April 18, 1955, at 8:00 am. Einstein's brain weighed 1,230 grams - well within the normal human range. Dr. Harvey sectioned the preserved brain into 170 pieces in a lab at the University of Pennsylvania, a process that took three full months to complete. Those 170 sections were then sliced in microscopic slivers and mounted onto slides and stained. There were 12 sets of slides created with hundreds of slides in each set. Harvey retained two complete sets for his own research and distributed the rest to handpicked leading pathologists of the time. No permission for the removal and preservation had been given by Einstein or his family, but when the family learned about the study, permission to proceed with the study was granted as long as the results were only published in scientific journals and not sensationalised.

== Removal of Einstein's brain ==
In August 1978, New Jersey Monthly reporter Steven Levy published an article, "I Found Einstein's Brain", based on his interview with Harvey, when Harvey was working at a medical test laboratory, in Wichita, Kansas. In 1988, Harvey retired and moved to Lawrence, Kansas, near William Burroughs. In 1996, Harvey moved from Weston, Missouri to Titusville in Hopewell Township, Mercer County, New Jersey. In the 1994 documentary Relics: Einstein's Brain, Kinki University Professor Sugimoto Kenji asks Harvey for a piece of the brain, to which Harvey consents and slices a portion of the brain-stem. Footage shows Harvey segmenting and handing over to Sugimoto a portion. In 1998, Harvey delivered the remaining uncut portion of Einstein's brain to Dr. Elliot Krauss, a pathologist at University Medical Center at Princeton. As Marian Diamond and associates discovered, certain parts of Einstein's brain were found to have a higher proportion of glial cells than the average male brain. Diamond compared the ratio of glial cells in Einstein's brain with that of the preserved brains of 11 other males. (Glial cells provide support and nutrition in the brain, form myelin, and participate in signal transmission, and are the other integral component of the brain, besides the neurons.) Dr. Diamond's laboratory made thin sections of Einstein's brain, each 6 micrometers thick. They then used a microscope to count the cells. Einstein's brain had more glial cells relative to neurons in all areas studied, but only in the left inferior parietal area was the difference statistically significant. This area is part of the association cortex, regions of the brain responsible for incorporating and synthesizing information from multiple other brain regions. A stimulating environment can increase the proportion of glial cells and the high ratio could possibly result from Einstein's life studying stimulating scientific problems. The limitation that Diamond admits in her study is that she had only one Einstein to compare with 11 brains of normal intelligence individuals. S. S. Kantha of the Osaka Bioscience Institute criticized Diamond's study, as did Terence Hines of Pace University. Other issues related to Diamond's study point out glial cells continue dividing as a person ages and although Einstein's brain was 76, it was compared to brains that averaged 64 in age (eleven male brains, 47–80 years of age). Diamond in her landmark study "On the Brain of a Scientist: Albert Einstein" noted that the 11 male individuals whose brains were used in her control base had died from nonneurologically related diseases. Diamond also noted that "Chronological age is not necessarily a useful indicator in measuring biological systems. Environmental factors also play a strong role in modifying the conditions of the organism. One major problem in dealing with human specimens is that they do not come from controlled environments."

In 2005, on the occasion of the 50th anniversary of Einstein's death, the 92-year-old Harvey gave interviews regarding the history of the brain from his home in New Jersey.

Harvey died at the University Medical Center at Princeton on April 5, 2007, from complications of a stroke.

== Legacy ==
In 2010, Harvey's heirs transferred all of his holdings constituting the remains of Albert Einstein's brain to the National Museum of Health and Medicine, including 14 photographs of the whole brain prior to sectioning, never before revealed to the public.

== TV and film reporting ==
- Relics: Einstein's Brain, 1994 documentary

The story of Harvey's autopsy of Einstein's brain, and its subsequent study, was explained in an episode of the Science Channel show Dark Matters: Twisted But True, a series which explores the darker side of scientific discovery and experimentation, which premiered on September 7, 2011. The program segment "The Secrets of Einstein's Brain" re-aired on the History Channel on June 4, 2016.

The Man Who Stole Einstein's Brain (2023).
