= National Association of School Psychologists =

U.S. professional organization

- Formation: 1969
- Headquarters: Bethesda, Maryland
- Location: United States
- Executive Director: Eric Rossen
- President: Jason Pedersen
- Website: www.nasponline.org

The National Association of School Psychologists (NASP) is the major national professional organization for school psychologists in the United States.

== Mission and purpose ==
Its stated mission is to "represent and support school psychology through leadership to enhance the mental health and educational competence of all children." The vision of NASP is that all children and youth access the learning, behavior, and mental health support needed to thrive in school, at home, and throughout life. The four main purposes of this organization are "a) to actively promote the interests of school psychology; b) to advance the standards of the profession; c) to help secure the conditions necessary to the greatest effectiveness of its practice; and d) to serve the mental health and educational interest of all children and youth". Dr. Andrea Clyne, former President of the National Association of School Psychologists, stated that “School psychologists bring a rich and unique set of skills to their school communities. They are champions for children, families, and schools, working hard to apply their knowledge about mental health, learning, equity, and systems to address challenges that thwart progress.”

== History ==
The National Association of School Psychologists was created on March 15, 1969, during a two-day national conference in St. Louis. NASP is the world's largest organization to serve the interests of school psychologists exclusively. NASP is govern by nationally elected officers and state-elected representatives to the NASP's primary legislative body, NASP Delegates Assembly. There are two delegate representatives in each of its four region with the executive council consisting of the elected officers and program managers. Including committee members, editors, etc. within the program manager areas, the governing body exceeds 200 individuals. The policies and business of NASP emanate from the association’s central office, located in Bethesda, Maryland. In 2020, NASP started National School Psychology Week

== Organization and services ==
NASP provides a year-round membership and access to evidence-based resources, periodicals exploring the most current issues, and networking opportunities. There are different rates and categories offered to become a member such as regular member, student member, retired member, international member, and so forth. The memberships run from July 1-June 30. NASP offers a Find-A-Mentor Program where an individual can choose to become a mentor or find a mentor. This program provides support at all levels of professional growth and development. NASP also offers awards, grants, and scholarships.

The NASP Practice Model represents NASP's official policy regarding the delivery of school psychological services.

While the American Psychological Association (APA) serves similar purposes through Division 16, one way that NASP differs fundamentally from the APA is in that it officially recognizes the specialist degree as the entry-level degree for the field, as opposed to the doctoral degree. The two organizations, however, are more complementary than competing. Many view NASP as the governing body for sub-doctoral school psychologists and the APA as the governing body for doctoral-level school psychologists, although many doctoral-level school psychologists are also members of the NASP. Further, NASP approval of graduate programs does not compete with APA accreditation; the APA does not accredit non-doctoral programs, and NASP will more quickly approve programs that have already been APA-accredited.

NASP provides standards for ethics and practice, and approves graduate training programs that sufficiently adhere to its training guidelines. NASP is a constituent member of the National Council for Accreditation of Teacher Education (NCATE) and although NCATE accredits units (such as colleges of education), not programs, it does provide "national recognition" status to NASP-approved programs located in units accredited by NCATE.

The organization also offers an opportunity for those who have successfully completed their graduate coursework, participated in a 1200-hour internship with at least 600 hours in a school setting, and received a score of at least 660 on the School Psychologist Praxis II Examination to apply for National Certification in School Psychology.

The National Association of School Psychologists currently distributes one journals: School Psychology Review, which is the second-largest psychology academic journal and includes research and theory related to school psychology. It previously distributed School Psychology Forum: Research in Practice, an electronic publication, but the final issue was published in spring 2019. NASP also publishes a periodical, Communiqué, which is the official newspaper of NASP that covers news, events, innovative practices, legislative developments, and other topics relevant to the field.

NASP also provides a yearly convention which takes place in various cities and states. This convention hosts a wide variety of school psychologists. The convention allows for professional development, training and research to be presented.

The National Association of School Psychologists releases data on school psychologists such as their State Shortages Data Dashboard.
