= Connor–Davidson Resilience Scale =

Means of testing human resilience

The Connor–Davidson Resilience Scale (CD-RISC) was developed by Kathryn M. Connor and Jonathan R.T. Davidson as a means of assessing resilience. The CD-RISC is based on Connor and Davidson's operational definition of resilience, which is the ability to "thrive in the face of adversity." Since its development in 2003, the CD-RISC has been tested in several contexts with a variety of populations (see Generalizability) and has been modified into different versions (see Forms).

== Factor Structure ==
=== Development ===
The CD-RISC was created to improve on existing measures of resilience (e.g., hardiness or perceived stress). Existing scales of resilience were considered inadequate because they lacked generalizability. With this in mind, the CD-RISC was tested using a variety of populations to increase the generalizability of the measure. These groups included a community sample, primary care outpatients, general psychiatric outpatients, a clinical trial of generalized anxiety disorder, and two clinical trials of PTSD.

The authors drew inspiration for the scale's content from the work of previous researchers of hardiness, most notably S.C. Kobasa and M. Rutter. The CD-RISC consists of 25 items, which are evaluated on a five-point Likert scale ranging from 0 to 4: not true at all (0), rarely true (1), sometimes true (2), often true (3), and true nearly all of the time (4) – these ratings result in a number between 0–100, and higher scores indicate higher resilience.

Factor analysis of the original scale produced five factors:

- Personal competence, high standards, and tenacity
- Trust in one's instincts, tolerance of negative affect, and strengthening effects of stress
- Positive acceptance of change and secure relationships
- Control
- Spiritual influences

The individual items are as follows (table adapted from Connor and Davidson 2003):

Item no.	Description
1	Able to adapt to change
2	Close and secure relationships
3	Sometimes fate or God can help
4	Can deal with whatever comes
5	Past success gives confidence for new challenge
6	See the humorous side of things
7	Coping with stress strengthens
8	Tend to bounce back after illness or hardship
9	Things happen for a reason
10	Best effort no matter what
11	You can achieve your goals
12	When things look hopeless, I don't give up
13	Know where to turn to for help
14	Under pressure, focus and think clearly
15	Prefer to take the lead in problem solving
16	Not easily discouraged by failure
17	Think of self as strong person
18	Make unpopular or difficult decisions
19	Can handle unpleasant feelings
20	Have to act on a hunch
21	Strong sense of purpose
22	In control of your life
23	I like challenges
24	You work to attain your goals
25	Pride in your achievements

=== Validity ===
==== Construct validity ====
There are a lack of studies that support the construct validity of the CD-RISC. In order for a measure to demonstrate good construct validity, it needs to be based on a complex, detailed theoretical construct (i.e., nomological network). If the measure has good construct validity, then it should "behave" as a measure of this complex concept should behave. The CD-RISC has been associated as expected (i.e., either positively or negatively) with various constructs, such as family functioning and depressive symptoms. However, it needs to be tested in relation to a more complex theory to better establish construct validity.

==== Convergent validity ====
Scores on the CD-RISC have been compared to several scales designed to measure the same or a similar construct. CD-RISC scores have been significantly positively correlated with a measure of hardiness. Also, the CD-RISC significantly negatively correlated with both the Perceived Stress Scale and the Sheehan Stress Vulnerability Scale. This indicates that the resilience scores obtained from the CD-RISC correspond to lower levels of perceived stress and perceived stress vulnerability, respectively. All of these findings indicate suggests good convergent validity of the CD-RISC.

==== Predictive validity ====
Bezdjian and colleagues (2017) used the CD-RISC to examine the relationship between resilience and 6-month unsuitability attrition (i.e., separation from the military due to difficulties with mental health or behavioral adjustments) and between resilience and mental health diagnosis at 6 months after the start of basic training. Results indicated that service members who were separated from the Air Force due to unsuitability had reported lower levels of resilience at basic training as compared to those who were not separated. Service members diagnosed with a mental disorder at 6 months of service had also reported lower levels of resilience at basic training as compared to those who were not diagnosed with a mental disorder. The effect size of both associations was medium, which points to moderate predictive validity of the CD-RISC.

==== Gender differences ====
Though Connor and Davidson (2003) did not find gender differences in their sample when developing the CD-RISC, subsequent findings regarding gender differences within the CD-RISC have supported two other conclusions:

1. Higher Resilience in Men
  1. Campbell-Sills, Forde, and Stein (2009) found that in a large-scale community sample, men report higher levels of resilience than women when assessed with the CD-RISC. One explanation for this trend is that women report higher rates of psychiatric disorders that have a stress-related component (e.g., PTSD). Additionally, this difference may be due to a reporting bias – in other words, men more than women may be more concerned with being seen as able to handle stress and adversity, so they report higher scores on the CD-RISC.
1. Higher Resilience in Women
  1. In a sample of over 50,000 Air Force Service Members, female participants scored higher on average than their male counterparts on the CD-RISC. Women self-reported higher average levels of resilience on all but three items. One reason given for this difference (as compared to findings from previous civilian studies) is that the women in this study volunteered to join the military, and those who do this may be more likely to have higher initial levels of resilience. However, research looking at the average resilience levels in military populations have not specifically examined gender differences.

== Forms ==
=== CD-RISC2 ===
An abbreviated, two-item version of the CD-RISC, the CD-RISC2, was created in 2005 to reduce administration time. It assessed resilience in members of the general population as well as patients with post-traumatic stress disorder, depression, and anxiety. The two items used for this scale are item 1 ("Able to adapt to change") and item 8 ("Tend to bounce back after illness or hardship"). These items were chosen because Connor and Davidson deemed them capable of "etymologically capturing the essence of resilience." After analysis of test-retest reliability, convergent validity, and divergent validity, the CD-RISC2 demonstrated "significant correlation" with both the CD-RISC as a whole and with the individual items of the CD-RISC. The authors argue that since the CD-RISC2 sufficiently represents the original measure, the 2-item CD-RISC2 can be utilized in place of the 25-item CD-RISC.

=== 10-item CD-RISC ===
Campbell-Sills and Stein (2007) refined the original 25-item CD-RISC and validated a 10-item version of the measure, called the CD-RISC-10. The authors recognized the 25-item version's acceptable demonstration of reliability and validity but were concerned about the measure's 5-factor structure. They were confused about the conceptual relationships between items that appeared in the same factors (e.g., positive acceptance and secure relationships) and questioned the statistical analyses used to reach the conclusions. In light of these concerns, the authors worked to establish the factor structure of the CD-RISC using a more systematic approach. Additionally, they hoped to analyze the measure's construct validity to further validate it.

Using factor analysis and three independent samples, the authors concluded that modifying the original scale to only include 10-items would improve the validity of the scale. They deleted items that, theoretically, would make sense to include in a measure of resilience but that did not carry enough statistical weight to still be included (e.g. measures of social support). They used exploratory factor analysis and confirmatory factor analysis to justify these deletions. The 10 items included in this abridged scale assess one's ability to endure difficult experiences, including "change, personal problems, illness, pressure, failure, and painful feelings." The authors found that scores on the 10-item CD-RISC correlated highly with score on the original 25-item CD-RISC.

There were limitations to this analysis. For example, the samples used in this study to evaluate the psychometric properties of the 10-item CD-RISC did not include a clinical sample or a sample of individuals who had experienced high levels of trauma. Because of this, the conclusions drawn cannot be applied to these populations. The authors recognize that this could be considered an issue since the concept of resilience is often only considered relevant when related to the experience of trauma. However, the authors explain that resilience can be applied to more moderate levels of stress. Therefore, the concept of resilience and the 10-item CD-RISC measure can be applied to the general population, not just those who have experienced trauma. The authors also cite problems with using retrospective self-report to collect data (which, in this case, was unavoidable) and suggest that a resilience measure that does not rely on self-report should be created.

== Generalizability ==
The CD-RISC has achieved notable reliability and validity in a variety of populations, and each study using the CD-RISC adds support to the measure's generalizability (see below).

=== Culture ===
Ensuring that a measure can be applied across different languages and cultures often proves to be a difficult task due to differences in societal norms and trouble with translation. For example, a behavior that is considered normal in one culture could be perceived as completely abnormal in another, simply due to differences in how this behavior is perceived.

Both the 25-item CD-RISC and the CD-RISC-10 have been shown to be reliable and valid within the context of several distinct, diverse cultures, including Korean, Chinese, German, and Spanish.

=== Trauma ===
==== Severe injury/surgery ====
The CD-RISC was used to study resilience in patients with end-stage liver disease and waiting for liver transplantation. The researchers performed various statistical analyses (including exploratory factor analysis) to determine the best way to use the CD-RISC within their sample and concluded that a 20-item, single-factor version fit best with the data. Results indicated that CD-RISC scores correlated negatively with depression and anxiety. Scores correlated positively with social support and health related quality of life. Resilience was not associated with the severity of the patients' liver disease.

Another study used the original 25-item CD-RISC to look at the relationship between resilience and the emotional response of women experiencing a diagnosis of breast cancer and breast cancer surgery. They found that the overall level of resilience was similar between the group of cancer patients and the control group (i.e., women without a cancer diagnosis). Additionally, resilience acted as a protective factor against the patients' development of depression and anxiety symptoms. Compared to the control group, the cancer patients who reported higher levels of resilience also reported comparable levels of emotional well-being, even though on average cancer patients reported more depression, anxiety, negative affect, and less happiness.

==== Military ====
Since resilience is most often associated with the experience of trauma, exploring the concept within the military population has become a popular topic of interest. This particular population often experiences unique trauma and stressors compared to the general population, such as combat exposure. Combat exposure includes engaging in enemy fire, witnessing the injury or death of another person, or being in danger oneself.

The CD-RISC was used to investigate the relationship between resilience and psychological functioning in a group of United States military veterans who fought as part of Operation Enduring Freedom (OEF) or Operation Iraqi Freedom (OIF). Specifically, the relationship between trauma exposure, resilience, and PTSD diagnosis was of interest. It was hypothesized that resilience would act as a moderator between trauma exposure and PTSD diagnosis and that higher levels of resilience would be associated with more positive psychological outcomes. The findings supported both of these hypotheses. Results indicated that resilience acted as a protective factor against the development of PTSD and that it was significantly related to other aspects of psychological functioning (e.g., suicidality).

In a similar study, the CD-RISC was used to examine the relationship between resilience, unit support, postdeployment social support, PTSD and depressive symptom severity, and psychosocial functioning in a sample of United States military veterans who served during OEF or OIF. The authors hypothesized that resilience would mediate the relationship between unit support and PTSD and depressive symptoms. Additionally, they hypothesized that postdeployment social support would mediate the relationship between PTSD and depressive symptoms and psychosocial functioning. Results supported both hypotheses. Scores on the CD-RISC were negatively associated with scores on measures of PTSD and depressive symptoms. Lower levels of unit support and postdeployment social support were associated with higher levels of PTSD and depressive symptoms and lower levels of resilience and psychosocial functioning. Resilience fully mediated the relationship between unit support and PTSD and depressive symptoms, which confirms the first hypothesis. Finally, postdeployment social support partially mediated the relationship between PTSD and depressive symptoms and psychosocial difficulties, which supports the second hypothesis.

== Limitations and criticisms ==
Connor and Davidson (2003) recognized the limitations of the CD-RISC, citing lack of validation against objective measures of resilience, the complications of defining resilience in relation to the measure (i.e. would an individual be considered resilience if they performed well in one area when faced with hardship but not in another?), and lack of evaluation of directional factors.

Multiple investigations have called into question the five factor model presented by Connor and Davidson. However, these studies have failed to come to an agreement as to what the proper factor model should be. Some studies have managed to obtain a five factor structure like Connor and Davidson, but the content of the models was not always the same. Other studies have found a four-factor solution to be best. Another has been unable to determine a single number, instead reporting a structure with two or three factors, for example. Cultural differences in item interpretation, differences in test settings, and differences in analytic strategy have all been cited as possible reasons for these inconsistencies.

Another potential reason for the inconsistency in these findings is that the number of items in the original scale is insufficient. Normally, three or more "strongly loaded" items (i.e. items that carry a lot of statistical weight or importance) are needed to ensure the reliability of these factors. The 25 item CD-RISC does not always stick to these guidelines. For example, Factor 5 (spiritual influences) only has two items that support it. Because of the discrepancies in these findings surrounding factor structure, the subscales of the original CD-RISC are not recommended to be used alone.
