= Marian Diamond =

American professor of human anatomy and neuroanatomy (1926–2017)

Marian C. Diamond
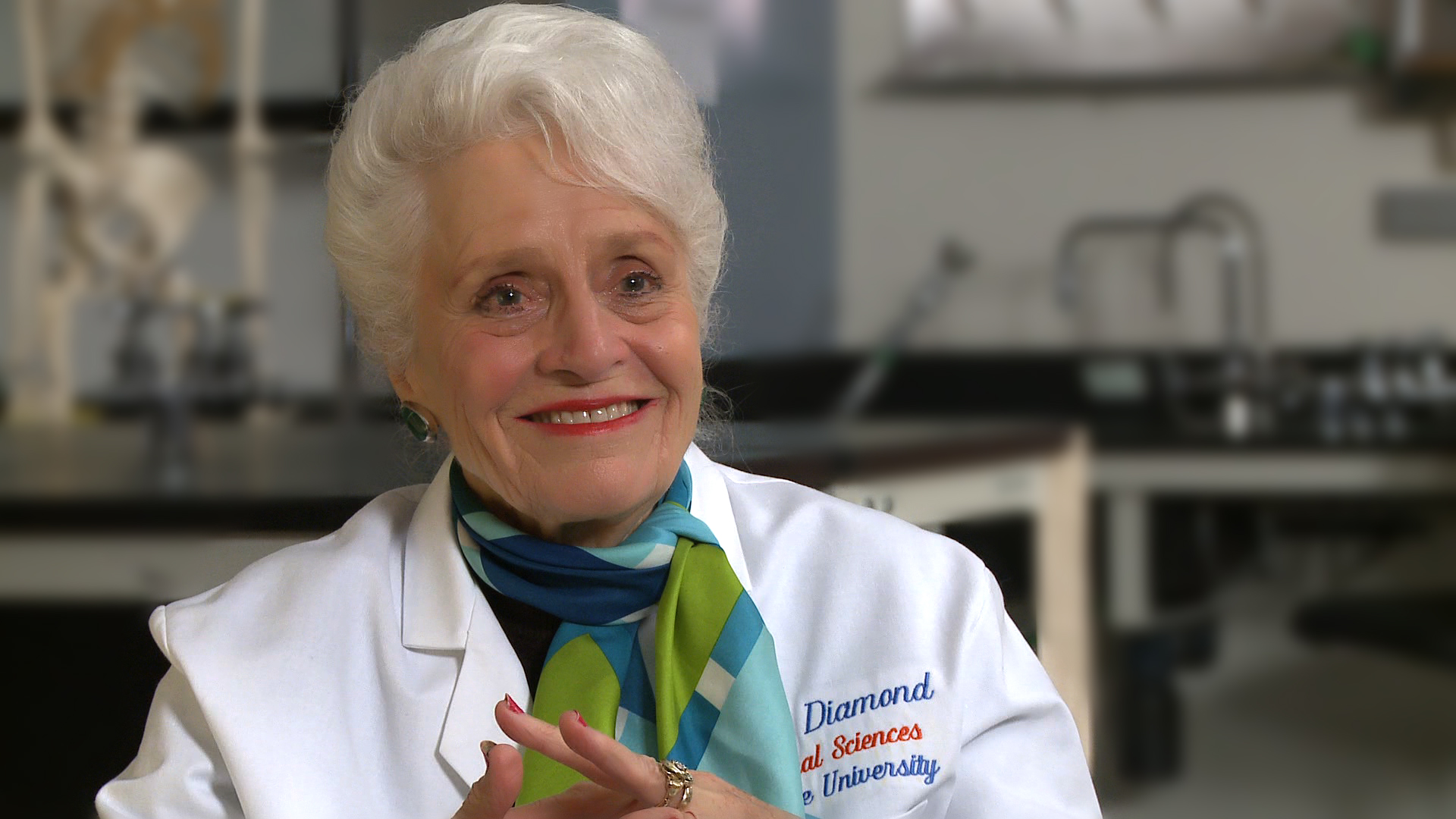
- Born: Marian Cleeves; November 11, 1926; Glendale, California, U.S.
- Died: July 25, 2017 (aged 90); Oakland, California, U.S.
- Education: Glendale Community College; University of California, Berkeley; University of Oslo
- Spouses: Richard Martin Diamond (1950–1979 div.); Arnold Scheibel (m. 1982)
- Scientific career
- Fields: Neuroanatomy
- Workplaces: University of California, Berkeley
- Thesis: Functional Interrelationships of the Hypothalamus and the Neurohypophysis (1953)

Marian Cleeves Diamond (November 11, 1926 – July 25, 2017) was an American neuroscientist. She and her team were the first to publish evidence that the brain can change with experience and improve with enrichment, what is now called neuroplasticity. She was a professor of anatomy at the University of California, Berkeley.

Diamond's research on the brain of Albert Einstein contributed to the understanding of the roles of glial cells in the brain. Other published research explored differences between the cerebral cortex of male and female rats, the link between positive thinking and immune health, and the role of women in science.

== Early life and education ==
Born in Glendale, California, to Montague Cleeves and Rosa Marian Wamphler Cleeves as the sixth and last child in the family. Her father was an English physician and her mother a Latin teacher at Berkeley High School. Diamond grew up in La Crescenta and with her siblings she was educated near home at La Crescenta grammar school, at Clark Junior High, and at Glendale High School. Before going to University of California, Berkeley, she studied at Glendale Community College. She played tennis at Berkeley, earning a letter.

In 1948, Diamond obtained her bachelor's degree from Berkeley. She spent a summer at the University of Oslo after graduating. When returning to Berkeley for graduate studies, she became the first female graduate student in the department of anatomy. Her doctoral dissertation thesis on human anatomy was titled "Functional Interrelationships of the Hypothalamus and the Neurohypophysis" and was published in 1953. While studying for her PhD degree, Diamond also began to teach, a passion that continued well into her eighties.

== Academic and scientific career ==
During 1952 to 1953 she worked as a research assistant at Harvard University. She became the first woman science instructor at Cornell University teaching human biology and comparative anatomy from 1955 to 1958. In 1960 she returned to the University of California, Berkeley with the role of lecturer.

In the role as neuroanatomist, she joined an ongoing research project with psychologists David Krech, Mark Rosenzweig, and chemist Edward Bennett. By 1964, this group had the first evidence, from anatomical measurements, of plasticity in the mammalian cerebral cortex.

UC Berkeley invited Diamond to be an assistant professor in 1965, progressing later to be a full professor, and finally, professor emeritus until her death in 2017. In 1984, Diamond and her associates had access to sufficient tissue from Albert Einstein's brain to make the first ever analysis of it, followed by publication of their research. The 1985 paper On the Brain of a Scientist: Albert Einstein created some controversy in academia over the role of glial cells. However, it also ushered in new interest in neuroglia.

Her YouTube Integrative Biology lectures were the second most popular college course in the world in 2010.

=== Contributions to neuroplasticity ===
Marian Diamond was a pioneer in anatomical neuroscience whose major scientific contributions have changed forever how we view the human brain. Diamond produced the first scientific evidence of anatomical neuroplasticity in the early 1960s. At that time, the scientific consensus was that the nature of your brain was due to genetics and was unchangeable and fixed. Diamond showed that the structural components of the cerebral cortex can be altered by either enriched or impoverished environments at any age, from prenatal to extremely old age. Her initial anatomical experiment, and replication experiments, with young rats showed that the cerebral cortex of the enriched rats was 6% thicker than the cortex of the impoverished rats based on different kinds of early life experiences. An enriched cortex shows greater learning capacity while an impoverished one shows lesser learning capacity. These paradigm-changing results, published in 1964, helped to launch modern neuroscience.

Diamond demonstrated that the structural arrangement of the male and female cortices is significantly different and can be altered in the absence of sex steroid hormones.

Her research team also showed that the dorsal lateral frontal cerebral cortex is bilaterally deficient in the immune deficient mouse and can be reversed with thymic transplants. In humans, cognitive stimulation increases circulating CD4-positive T lymphocytes, supporting the idea that immunity can be voluntarily modulated, in other words, that positive thinking can impact the immune system.

=== Studies in Albert Einstein's brain ===
In early 1984, Diamond received four blocks of the preserved brain of Albert Einstein from Thomas Stoltz Harvey. Harvey, pathologist of Princeton Hospital at the time of Einstein's death, had removed Einstein's brain during autopsy in 1955 and maintained personal possession of the brain. The fact that the Einstein brain tissue was already embedded in celloidin when the Diamond lab received it meant that their choice of methods of examination would be somewhat limited.

Her research team were able to successfully analyze both the superior prefrontal (area 9) and inferior parietal (area 39) association cortices of the left and right hemispheres of Einstein's brain and compare results with the identical regions in the control base of 11 human, male, preserved brains. From previous analysis of the eleven control brains, her laboratory learned the frontal cortex did have more glial cells/neuron than the parietal cortex. After many years of research, Marian Diamond and her team had data proving that, in the rat brain, glial cells increased with enriched conditions, but did not increase with age. Diamond and her associates discovered that the big difference in all four areas was in nonneuronal cells. Einstein had more glial cells per neuron than the average male brains of the control group. Importantly, the biggest difference was found in area 39 of the left hemisphere of Einstein's brain where the increase in the number of glial cells per neuron was statistically significantly greater than in the control brains. Astrocyte and oligodendrocyte glial cells were pooled for these results.

== Personal life ==
Diamond married Richard Martin Diamond in 1950 and they had four children: Catherine Theresa (1953), Richard Cleeves (1955), Jeff Barja (1958), and Ann (1962). They divorced in 1979. Later in 1982, she married Arnold Bernard Scheibel, a neurosciences professor at the University of California, Los Angeles.

== Selected publications ==
Throughout her academic and scientific career she published multiple scientific articles and book chapters. The most popular are:

- Mohammed, A. H., Zhu, S. W., Darmopil, S., Hjerling-Leffler, J., Ernfors, P., Winblad, B., ... & Bogdanovic, N. (2002). Environmental enrichment and the brain. In Progress in brain research (Vol. 138, pp. 109–133). Elsevier.
- Diamond, M. C. (2001). Response of the brain to enrichment. Anais da Academia Brasileira de Ciências, 73(2), 211–220.
- Diamond, M. C. (1990). An optimistic view of the aging brain. In Biomedical advances in aging (pp. 441–449). Springer, Boston, MA.
- Diamond, M. C., Scheibel, A. B., Murphy Jr, G. M., & Harvey, T. (1985). On the brain of a scientist: Albert Einstein. Experimental neurology, 88(1), 198–204.
- Globus, A., Rosenzweig, M. R., Bennett, E. L., & Diamond, M. C. (1973). Effects of differential experience on dendritic spine counts in rat cerebral cortex. Journal of comparative and physiological psychology, 82(2), 175.
- Diamond, M. C., Law, F., Rhodes, H., Lindner, B., Rosenzweig, M. R., Krech, D., & Bennett, E. L. (1966). Increases in cortical depth and glia numbers in rats subjected to enriched environment. Journal of Comparative Neurology, 128(1), 117–125.
- Diamond, M. C., Krech, D., & Rosenzweig, M. R. (1964). The effects of an enriched environment on the histology of the rat cerebral cortex. Journal of Comparative Neurology, 123(1), 111–119.
- Bennett, E. L., Diamond, M. C., Krech, D., & Rosenzweig, M. R. (1964). Chemical and anatomical plasticity of brain. Science, 146(3644), 610–619.
- Rosenzweig, M. R., Krech, D., Bennett, E. L., & Diamond, M. C. (1962). Effects of environmental complexity and training on brain chemistry and anatomy: a replication and extension. Journal of comparative and physiological psychology, 55(4), 429.

=== Books ===
In 1985, she co-authored the coloring book entitled The Human Brain Coloring Book. Later, in 1988, she published the book Enriching Heredity: The Impact of the Environment on the Anatomy of the Brain. In 1998, she co-authored the book entitled Magic Trees of the Mind: How To Nurture Your Child's Intelligence, Creativity, and Healthy Emotions from Birth through Adolescence.

== Awards ==
Her work and scientific career have been recognized awarded multiple times by several national and international institutions.

- National Gold Medalist and Award for California Professor of the Year. Given by the Council for Advancement & Support of Education (Washington D.C.)
- California Biomedical Research Association Distinguished Service Award.
- Alumna of the Year. Awarded by the California Alumni Association.
- Presence in the San Francisco Chronicle Hall of Fame.
- University Medal. University of Zulia (Maracaibo, Venezuela).
- Brazilian Gold Medal of Honor.
- Benjamin Ide Wheeler Service Award.
- The Distinguished Senior Woman Scholar in America. Awarded by the American Association of University Women (1997).
- Clark Kerr Award. Given for her Distinguished Leadership in Higher Education (2012).
- International House Alumni Faculty Award (2016).
- Paola S. Timiras Memorial Award for Aging Research. Awarded by the Center for Research and Education in Aging (CREA) 2016.

== Documentary film ==
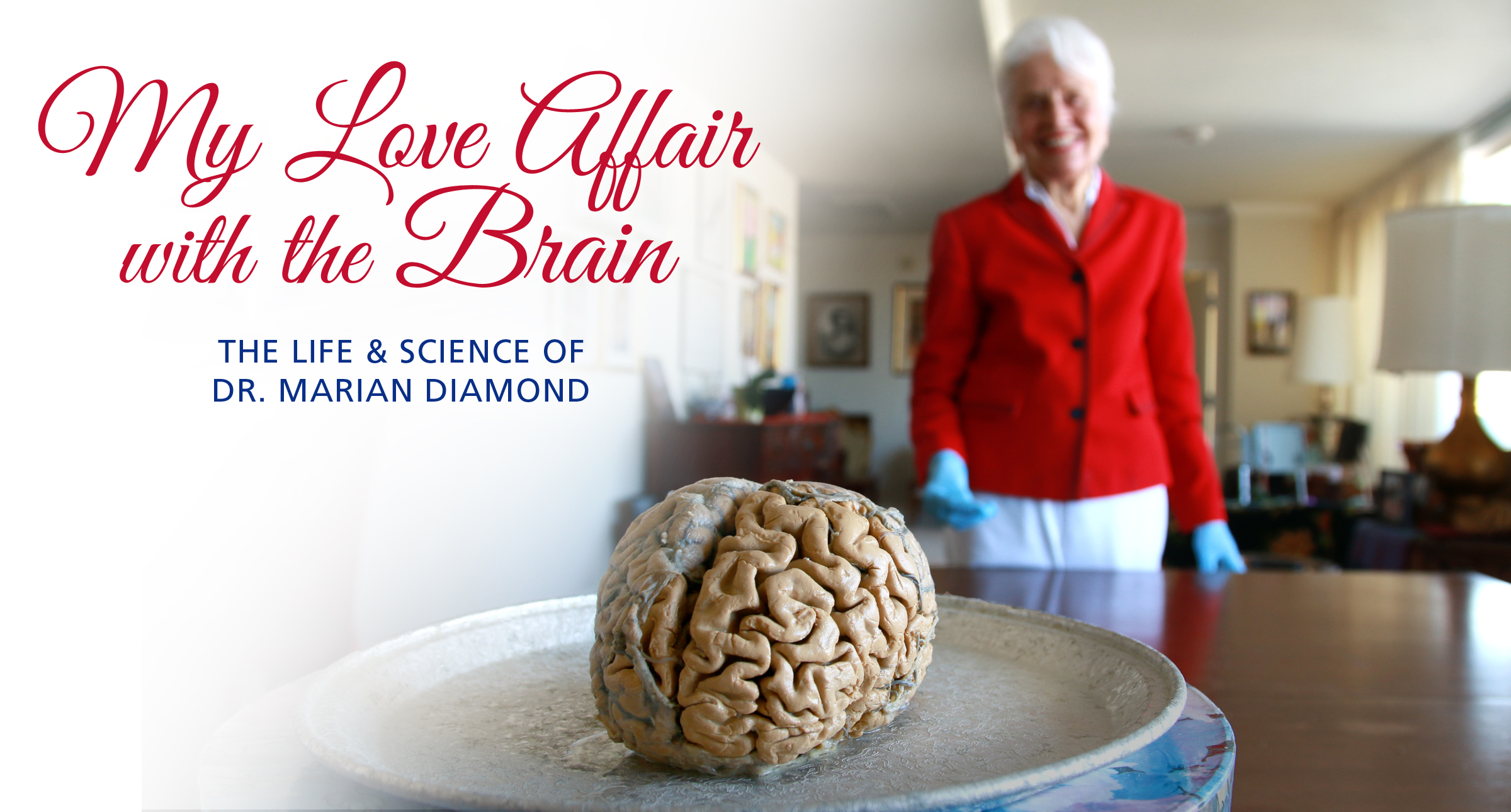
Poster of the documentary film My Love Affair with the Brain by Dr Marian Diamond.

My Love Affair with the Brain: The Life and Science of Dr. Marian Diamond is a 2017 documentary about Diamond's life as a pioneering woman of science, her curiosity and passion for the human brain, as well as her research and love of teaching. Producer-directors Catherine Ryan and Gary Weimberg of Luna Productions followed Diamond with their cameras for the final five years of her science and teaching career. The documentary film is narrated by the neuroscientist and actress Mayim Bialik.

The film's opening scene is Diamond with her signature teaching move: opening a floral hat box to reveal a preserved human brain, which she then holds in her hand while enumerating one of her many favorite aphorisms of appreciations of the brain, such as:

The brain is a three pound mass you can hold in your hand that can conceive of a universe a hundred billion light-years across.

=== Nominations and awards ===
My Love Affair with the Brain was broadcast on PBS. It was nominated and awarded in multiple occasions.

- 2018: Emmy Award for Outstanding Science and Technology Documentary.
- 2017: PRIX ADAV for Best Educational film of the year. Prize awarded at the Pariscience Festival International du Film Scientifque.
- 2017: Kavli-AAAS Science Journalism Gold Award for best in-depth science documentary.
- The documentary was included among Science Books & Film year-end list of Best Science Films.
- 2017: Audience Award for the Best Documentary. Awarded at the Durango Film Festival.
- 2016: Audience Award. Given at the Fest-RiverRun International Film Festival.
- 2016: Best Feature Film. Awarded during the American Psychological Association Film Festival.
- Best Documentary. Obtained at the Indigo Moon film festival and at the High Falls Film Festival in New York.
- Audience Favorite Award. Given at the Mill Valley Film Festival in California.
