= Social problem-solving =

Cognitive-behavioral process of adapting to everyday problems

Social problem-solving, in its most basic form, is defined as problem solving as it occurs in the natural environment. More specifically, it refers to the cognitive-behavioral process in which one works to find adaptive ways of coping with everyday situations that are considered problematic. This process is self-directed, conscious, effortful, cogent, and focused. Adaptive social problem-solving skills are known to be effective coping skills in an array of stressful situations. Social problem-solving consists of two major processes. One of these processes is known as problem orientation. Problem orientation is defined as the schemas one holds about problems in everyday life and ones assessment of their ability to solve said problems.

The problem orientation may be positive and constructive to the problem solving process or negative and, therefore, dysfunctional in the process. Problem-solving proper is known as the second major process in social problem-solving. This process refers to the skills and techniques one uses to search for solutions and apply these skills to find the best solutions available. This model has been expanded by McFall and Liberman and colleagues. In these variations social problem-solving is considered to be a multi-step process including the adoption of a general orientation, defining the problem, brainstorming for solutions, decision making, and follow up stages.

== Process ==
Based on the above model, it is hypothesized that a positive problem orientation leads to rational problem-solving skills. A rational problem-solving style is defined as a sensible, thoughtful, and methodical application of effective problem-solving skills. This, in turn, is most likely to result in positive outcomes and an exit from the problem solving process for this particular instance. When a negative outcome occurs, a person with rational problem solving skills is more likely to begin the cycle of problem-solving again. This time with the intent of finding a more appropriate solution or to redefine the problem. On the other hand, a negative problem solving orientation is likely to lead towards impulsive-careless or avoidant problem-solving styles. An impulsive-careless style is defined as narrowed, rash, thoughtless, speedy, and incomplete attempts at problem solving. An avoidance style to problem-solving is characterized by inaction, procrastination, and attempts to shift responsibility to others. Both of these styles are hypothesized to lead towards negative outcomes more often in the Social Problem-Solving Process. When negative outcomes occur, a person with an impulsive-careless or avoidant skill set is more likely to give up.

== Benefits and deficits ==
Social problem-solving involves various abilities and skills which lead to adaptive outcomes for several different populations. In general, effective problem-solving skills can have several benefits. These skills can increase situational coping and reduce emotional distress. Research has shown that one's problem orientation is specifically related to levels of psychological stress and adjustment. Of course, the opposite generally leads to negative outcomes. A lack of social problem-solving skills and a negative problem orientation can lead to depression and suicidality in children and adults, self-injurious behaviors, and increased worrying. Negative problem orientation and impulsive-careless problem solving styles have been commonly displayed by persons with personality disorders. Inpatients with Schizophrenia have also been observed to have deficits in social problem-solving skills.

== Therapy and intervention ==
Social problem-solving theory and processes have been used in intervention and therapeutic processes. In fact, a supportive problem-solving approach to therapy has been shown to be very effective in the reduction of depression symptoms. Children with autism and young neuro-typical children have been shown to increase their social problem-solving skills through a computer interface. Social problem-solving therapy has also been integrated into intervention packages for law offenders with personality disorders. Participants were shown to improve in most areas of measured social problem-solving skills.
