= Osaka Bioscience Institute =

Erstwhile Japanese research institute

Coordinates: 34°48′34.8″N 135°30′55.7″E

The Osaka Bioscience Institute was an institute in Osaka, Japan, between 1987 and 2015, devoted to the study of bioscience. The scientists from the institute discovered the retinal protein pikachurin.
