= Coughtrie =

Coughtrie is a surname. Notable people with the surname include:

- Richard Coughtrie (born 1988), English-born Scottish cricketer
- Stan Coughtrie (1935–2022), Scottish rugby union footballer
- Thomas Coughtrie (1917–2008), Scottish engineer and inventor

== See also ==
- Coughtry
