= Irwin Industrial Tools =

American tool manufacturer and distributor

- Type: Subsidiary of Stanley Black & Decker
- Industry: Manufacturing
- Founded: 1885; 141 years ago in Martinsville, Ohio
- Founder: Charles Irwin
- Headquarters: Huntersville, NC
- Key people: Charles Irwin, William Petersen
- Products: Hand tools
- Website: www.irwin.com

Previous logo

Irwin Industrial Tools is an American manufacturer and distributor of hand tools and power tool accessories. It is owned by Stanley Black & Decker. It is best known for producing Vise-Grip locking pliers. Additionally, it produces clamps, drill bits, taps and dies, screw extractors, bolt extractors, saw blades, pipe wrenches, screwdrivers, snips, and other construction tools.

== History ==
Irwin was founded in 1885 in Martinsville, Ohio as the Irwin Auger Bit Company by Charles Irwin, a pharmacist. Irwin had bought the rights to a solid-center auger bit from a local blacksmith.

C.H. Irwin Drug Store in Martinsville, Oh. Later became Irwin Tool Company.

In 1924, another blacksmith, Danish immigrant William S. Petersen of DeWitt, Nebraska, invented the first locking pliers and named them Vise-Grips. In 1934, Petersen formed the Petersen Manufacturing Company to produce them. In 1957, Petersen added an easy-release trigger to the design, creating the modern locking pliers design.

In 1985, American Tool Companies bought out Petersen Manufacturing. In 1993, American acquired The Irwin Tool Company, and in 2002, Newell Rubbermaid acquired American. In 2003, American officially changed its name to Irwin Industrial Tool Company.

In 2008, Irwin announced the closing of its DeWitt, Nebraska plant, ending 80 years of American production for Vise-Grips, citing a necessity to move production to China "to keep the Vise-Grip name competitive."

In 2010, Irwin closed the customer service office in Wilmington, OH and moved the customer service department to Huntersville, NC.

In October 2016 Stanley Black & Decker Inc agreed to buy Newell Brands Inc.’s tools business for $1.95 billion. The acquisition was completed in March 2017.

== Gallery ==
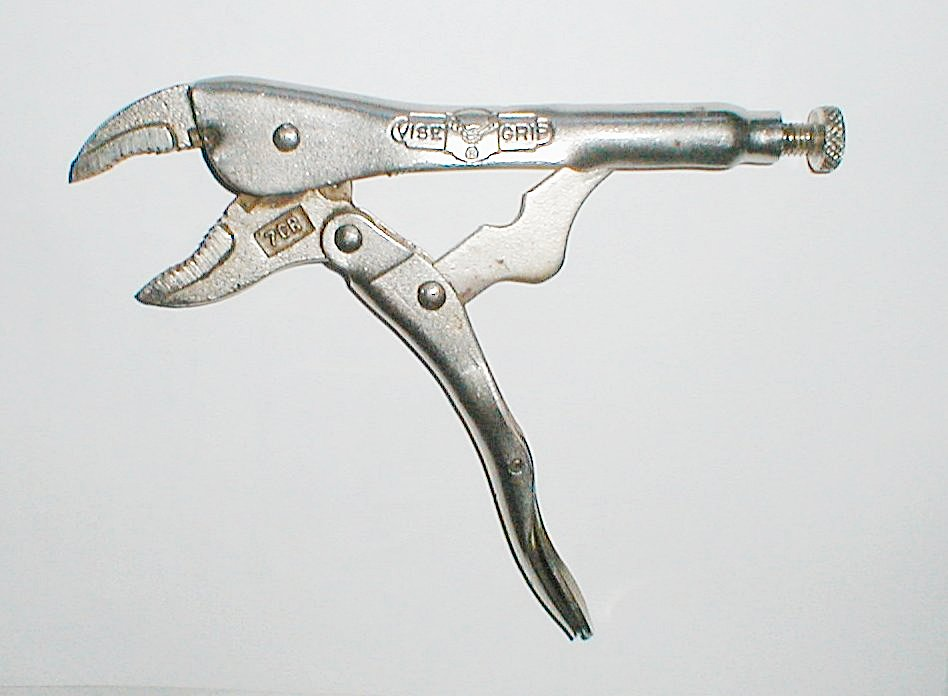
A pair of Vise-Grip locking pliers.

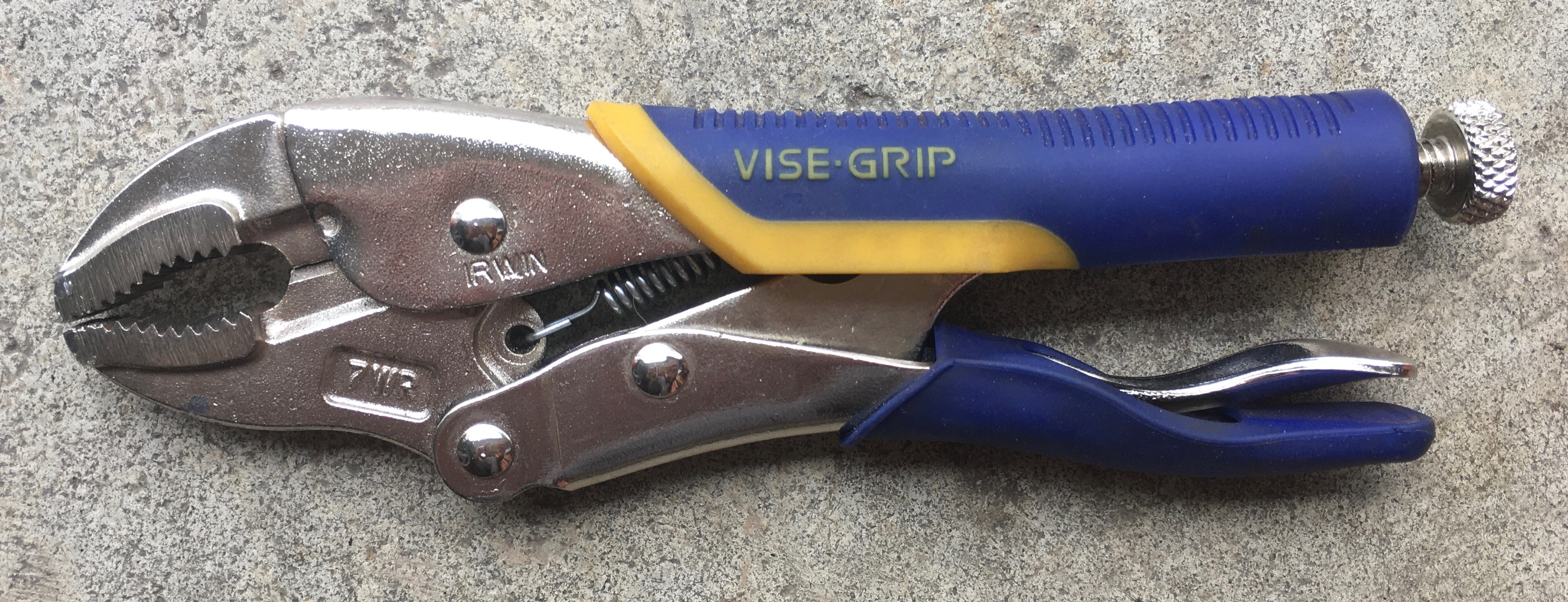
Vise-Grip curved-jaw locking pliers.

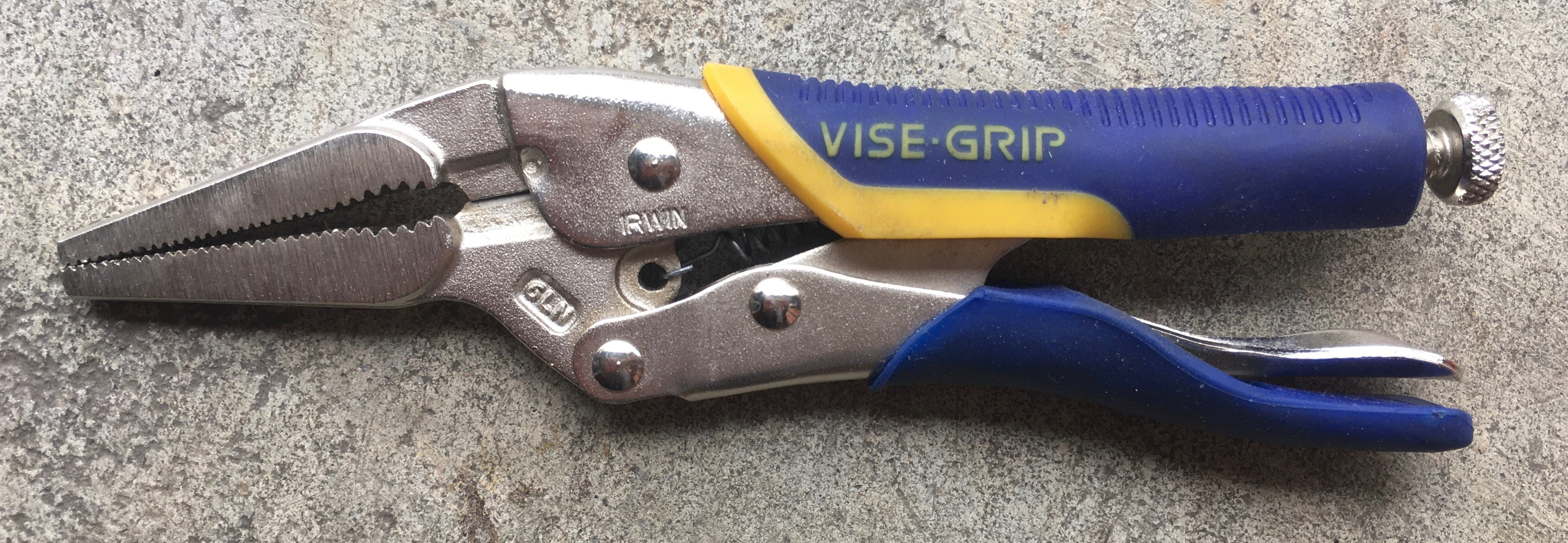
Vise-Grip long-nose locking pliers.

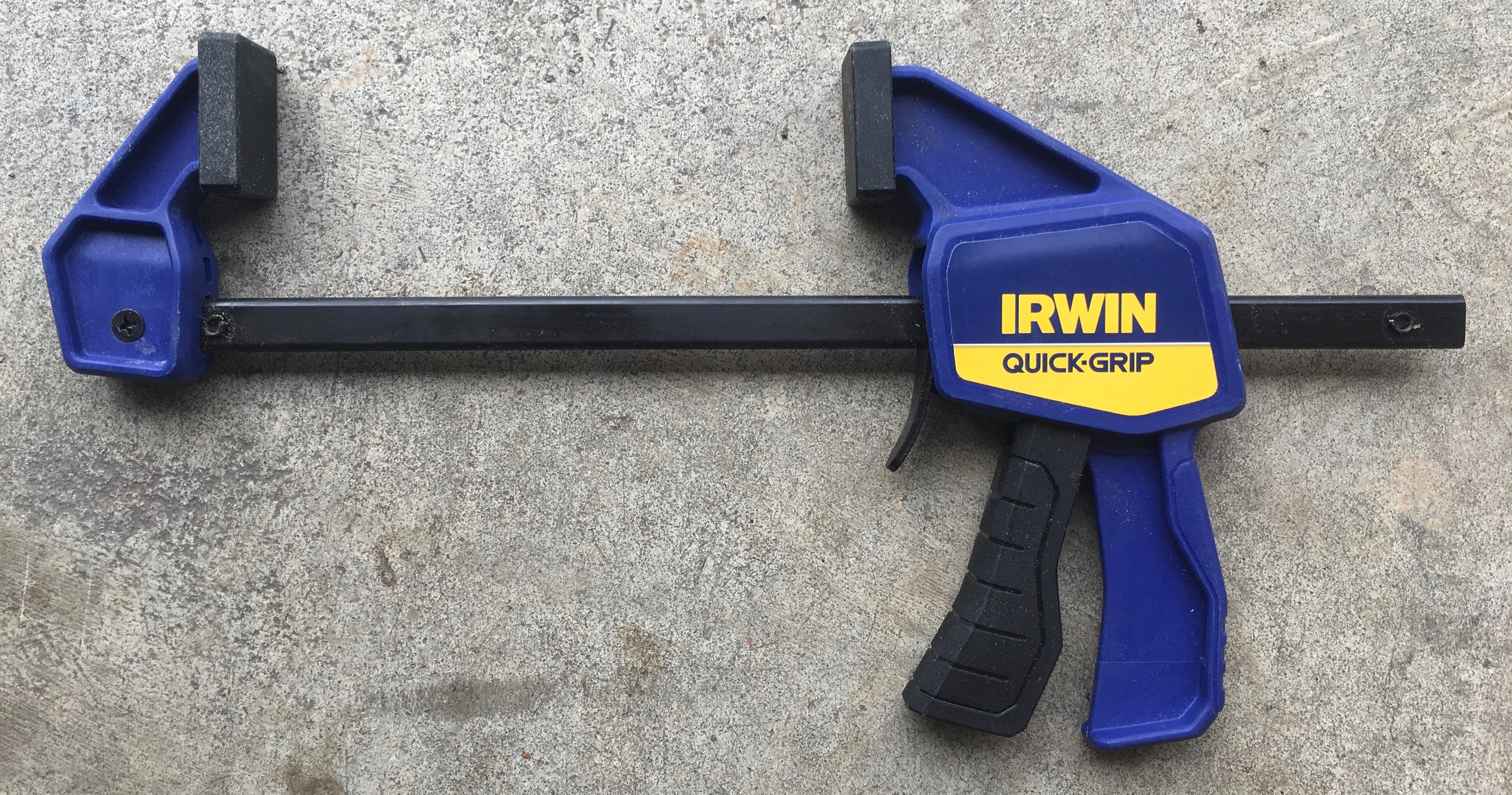
Quick-Grip bar clamp.

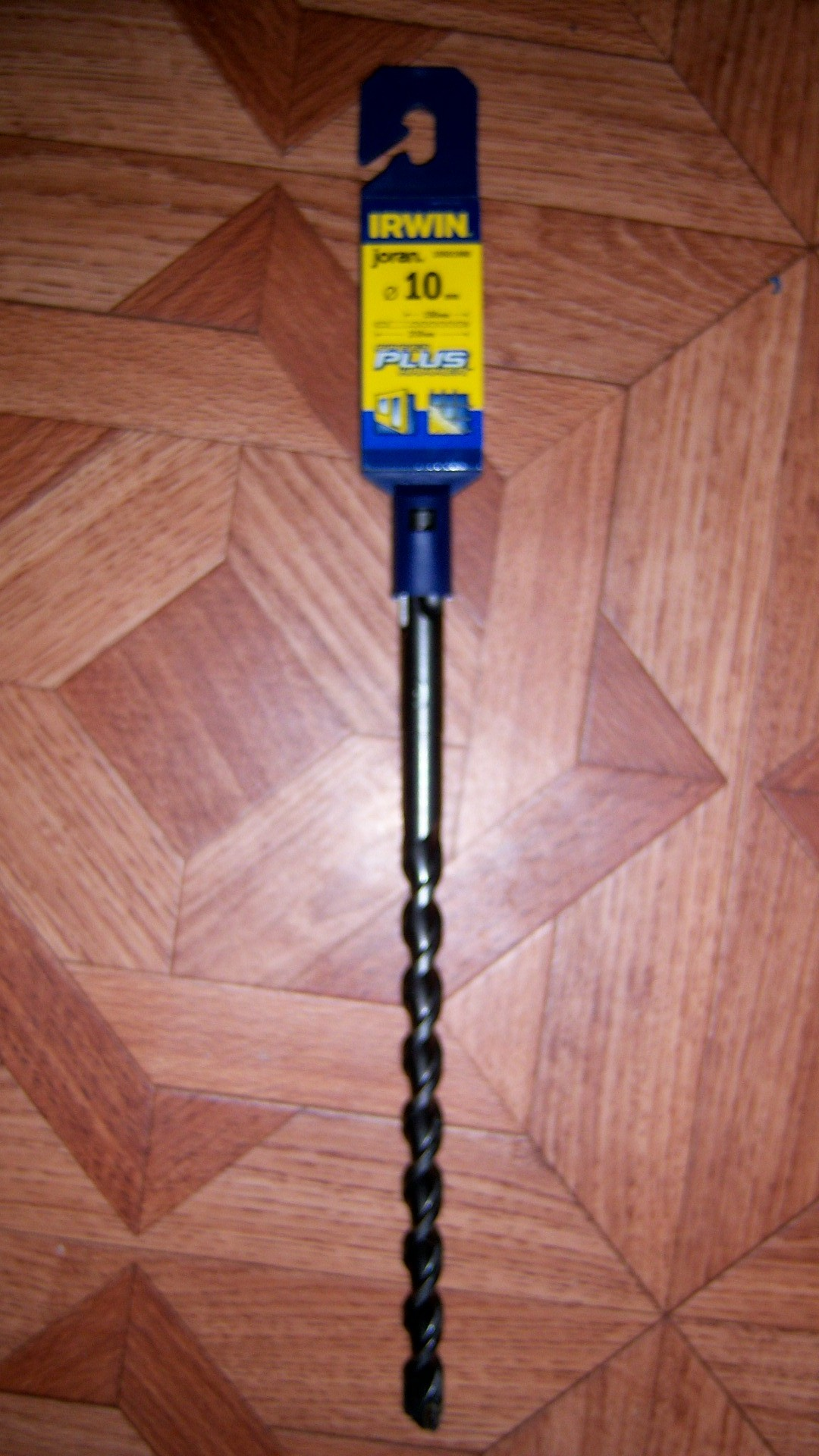
A masonry drill bit.

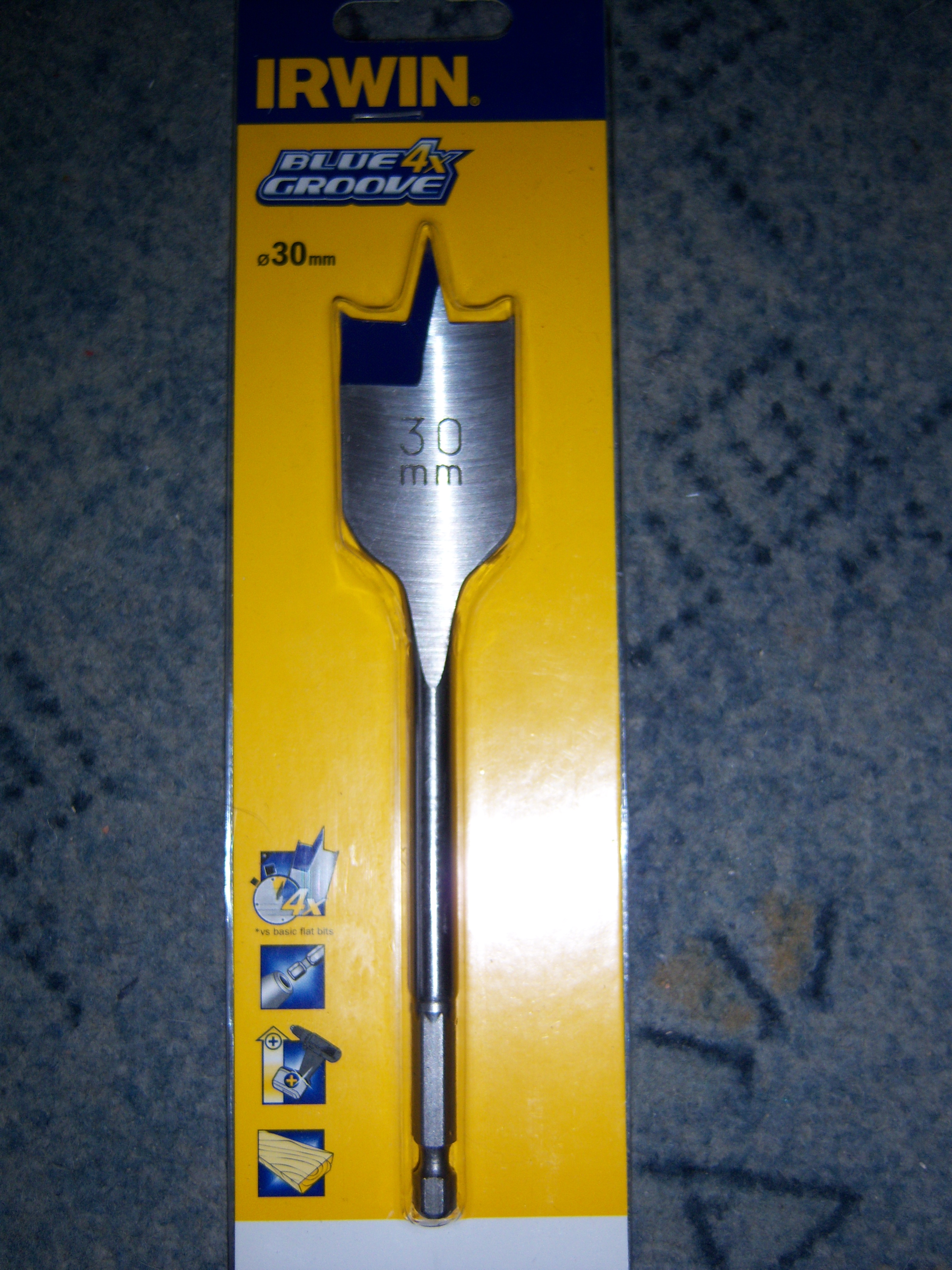
A spade bit.

== See also ==
- Irwin Tools Night Race—A NASCAR race formerly sponsored by the company.
