= Georgene =

Georgene is an English given name and a feminine form of George. It is a variant of the French Georgine.

== People ==
- Georgene Faulkner (1873–1958), American children's book author and storyteller
- Georgene Louis (born 1978), American attorney and politician
- Georgene Hoffman Seward (1902–1992), American feminist psychologist
