= Georgene Hoffman Seward =

American, Early feminist psychologist

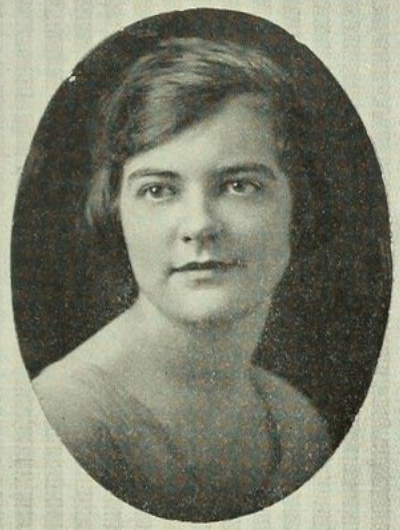
- Georgene Hoffman, from the 1923 yearbook of Barnard College
- Born: Georgene Janet Hoffman; January 21, 1902; Washington, D.C.
- Died: September 19, 1992 (aged 90); Los Angeles, California
- Education: Barnard College for Women; Columbia University
- Occupation: Psychologist
- Spouse: John Perry Seward Jr.

Georgene Hoffman Seward (January 21, 1902 – September 19, 1992), an early feminist psychologist, was best known for her research on sex roles and sex behavior. Having experienced much sex discrimination in academia herself, she dedicated her life to researching sex differences and minority experiences, and encouraging women to pursue leadership in science.

== Biography ==
Georgene Janet Hoffman was born in Washington, D.C., on January 21, 1902, to Georgene and Carl Henry Hoffman. While she was young her mother died and her father remarried, leaving Georgene to be raised by her grandfather and great aunt in New York City. She obtained her B.A. from Barnard College for Women in 1922; her initial interest had been the classics, but instead she majored in psychology. She completed graduate work at Columbia University, became a Curtis Scholar, and obtained her master's degree in 1924. During this time she met another graduate student, John Perry Seward Jr., whom she would marry in 1927 and with would begin a lifelong professional collaboration. In 1928 she received her PhD from Columbia.

Georgene and John worked at many colleges and universities over the years, with John ultimately settling in at University of California at Los Angeles and Georgene settling in at the University of Southern California for the remainder of their careers. The couple had two daughters, Barbara and Joan Perry ("Jerry"). After the death of their eldest daughter Barbara Seward Price age 30, on September 3, 1958, the couple created a scholarship in her memory at Columbia University where she had studied that would fully cover the expenses of a General Studies Student's tuition at the university.

Her husband, John, died in 1985; Georgene died on September 19, 1992, in Los Angeles, California.

== Professional career ==
Following her doctoral training, Georgene Seward taught at Hunter College in New York City for one year, before returning to Barnard College to teach from 1930 to 1937. During this time, her husband taught at Columbia University. During her professional career at Barnard College Seward was consistently overlooked for promotion in favour of her less experienced, less competent, male counterparts. This anecdote would repeat itself during her seven-year professional career running the psychology department at Connecticut College for Women with her husband. The fourteen years without acknowledgement for her abilities and accomplishments pushed Seward to research and tackle issues related to the feminine role.

From 1937 to 1944 Drs. Georgene and John Seward together began running the psychology department at Connecticut College for Women. Here the couple worked in close collaboration with many other prominent researchers at the time, including Harry and Leta Hollingworth, Otto Klineberg, Gardner and Lois Murphy, and Robert Woodworth. Dr. Seward's time at Connecticut College was during the Second World War gave her the opportunity to cross paths with many famous German psychologist that were evacuating Nazi Germany including; Wolfgang Köhler, Max Wertheimer, Karl Bühler and Charlotte Bühler.

In 1944, Seward published one of her first seminal pieces. This piece, entitled "Psychological effects of the menstrual cycle on women workers", demonstrated that the menstrual cycle has no impact on the performance of working women, debunking the myth of menstrual invalidism.

In 1944, the Sewards left Connecticut College for Women; Georgene Seward took at teaching position at Simmons College and John Seward took a position at Boston University. In 1946, the Sewards accepted positions on the west coast and moved to California; John joined the faculty at the University of California at Los Angeles, and Georgene joined the faculty at the University of Southern California, where she remained until her retirement in 1972. At USC, Georgene taught social and personality psychology, clinical psychology, and ran the clinical training program. It was there that Seward then began also working in private practice, in addition to her teaching duties. She was also a clinical consultant for the Veterans Administration Hospital, Metropolitan State Hospital, and the Didi Hirsch Mental Health Clinic. She continued to work in private practice until 1987.

Both of the Sewards were dedicated antifascists and socialists, during the 1950s the McCarthy Era prosecutions brought both Georgene and her husband John under scrutiny with the Loyalty oath Controversy (Sargent, 1993).

While in California, Dr. Georgene Seward continued her work in gender and minority studies. It was here that she publish two seminal works on gender, some of the first texts of their kind. The first was "Cultural conflict and the feminine role: An experimental study" (1945); in this study, Seward investigated individuals attitudes toward women in post-war America. She found that attitudes toward women and the roles they filled varied and were based largely on context (post-war American families were transitioning from a patriarchal to a more democratic structure), leading her to believe that these attitudes were the result of the socialization of sex roles. Her second was Sex and the social order (1946); in this book, Seward summarized much of the literature on what was known of sex differences, or the lack thereof. She returned to these interests again later in her career, coauthoring two additional books: Sex Roles in Changing Society (1970) and Sex Differences: Mental and Temperamental (1980).

During her time in California, Seward also began to explore how culture and minority status impact clinical practice. It was then that she published two additional important books: Psychotherapy and Culture Conflict (1956) and Clinical Studies in Culture Conflict (1958). In these books, Seward investigated the unique neuroticisms and stress experienced by minorities. These two books, having influenced both social psychological research and clinical practice, are often considered her two greatest contributions to the field. Throughout the remainder of her career, she continued pursuing such important work and encouraging other women to do the same.

In 1972 Seward retired as a professor emeritus at USC; at the same time John retired from UCLA. She continued to run her private clinical practice for another 15 years and returned to active collaboration with her husband. Seward's continuing impact is best known among Feminist psychology professionals and clinical workers, as her books, Psychotherapy and Culture Conflict (1956) and Clinical Studies in Culture Conflict (1958) were considered highly influential among professionals in the field at that time. Her observation and dedication to the effects of minority status encouraged greater understanding of how the social pressures that arise from cultural influences shape patient and therapist dynamics (Seward, 1956). Including the idea that female patients should have the opportunity to be treated by a female therapists.

Dr. Georgene Hoffman Seward was a dedicated researcher, clinician, and mentor, who remained involved in her work until 1987. In 1987, only five years before her death, Dr. Seward was awarded the Distinguished Psychologist Award by the California State Psychological Association in recognition of her own leadership in teaching, research, and community service.

== Contributions to psychology ==
Seward was one of the first female psychologists to explore, and debunk, various theories of sex differences. She was also one of the first clinical psychologists to consider the impact of culture and minority status on clinical settings and treatment techniques. She was a researcher devoted feminist issues, and was an early advocate seeking culturally appropriate and sensitive mental health treatment. As stated by Lisa Held, of Feminist Voices in Psychology, "she has become a role model for feminist psychologists". She was not only a brave pioneer in the field of gender studies, but was an avid supporter of female leadership in psychology.

=== Early academic career ===
During the Sewards’ early postdoctoral years they formed a professional relationship with the creator of the Pap test, G. N. Papanicolaou. This relationship would result in a number of studies on the reproductive behaviours of the guinea pig, including a comparison of male and female guinea pig sex drives and the specificity of the sex drive in male guinea pigs. Seward's early feminist works included The Psychological Effects of the Menstrual Cycle on Women Workers (1944) and an experimental study called Culture Conflict and the Feminine Role (1945). These works would be the prelude to a more comprehensive collection of social sex differences called Sex and the Social Order (1946).

=== Psychological effects of the menstrual cycle on women workers (1944) ===
The close of World War Two called for rapid re-evaluation of women's perceived ‘biological handicaps’; in particular the focus was upon the menstrual cycle, historically seen as a time of bed rest and delicacy. Dysmenorrhea essentially was extreme pain and disability associated with the menstrual cycle (Seward, 1944). Seward (1944) gathered reports on women workers from two main areas; industrial and education settings. In the industrial setting menstrual invalidism seems to be the ‘go-to’ explanation of the trend that women workers miss more work days than their male counterparts (Seward, 1944). However, little collected data of the time supported the belief that menstruating women were unable to effectively contribute. This included studies that looked to compare performance abilities that found little difference in reaction times between menstruating and non-menstruating women; further studies with male controls found little difference between males and menstruating females (Seward, 1944).

Seward (1944) accumulated evidence from a number of sources that employed female workers; the overall findings do not support the need to shelter females from work due to dysmenorrhea. One of these sources included a division of General Motors that not only employed female workers, but also had a clinic set up to help women workers deal with the negative consequences of dysmenorrhea with pain medication and simple exercises; and reported no significant absenteeism from women (Seward, 1944). Seward (1944) also reviewed differences between female students and their performance effects. Nursing students were compared to other female university students due to the difference in physical demand and revealed a significant difference in the number of dysmenorrhea related problems. This suggested that despite popular belief that work and activity were more beneficial than harmful for women (Seward, 1944). These findings did not support the code of menstrual invalidism that often took place in order to discriminate against women workers (Seward, 1944).

=== Culture Conflict and the Feminine Role (1945) ===
The feminine role with the close of World War Two was to become a huge social concern; with men returning from war, women would be expected to return to their original, dependent roles The cultural setting of the time cemented the male/female dichotomy as an absolute; this view idolized the male/female identity as something that was beyond human control and was most likely biologically driven (Seward, 1945). Seward (1945) rebutted this view through redefinition of the feminine role as a cultural aspect that was assigned to women to their role depending on the social pressures of the time. The core of the argument suggested that the feminine role was not an absolute across all cultural groups; even the traditional predominately patriarchal Western culture had variations in the expectations of the feminine role across time (Seward, 1945).

From clinical studies of psychologically sick women of the time Seward (1945) observed that a portion of these women's illnesses emerged from a conflict between social expectations of who they should be and who they were. The psychoanalytical theories of the time felt that this ‘masculine complex’ was an illness – the fallacy was grouping women with the motivation and talent to achieve outside of their expected domestic duties as being psychologically ill (Seward, 1945). Using Kurt Lewin’s Approach-Avoidance paradigm Seward (1945) argued that conflict arises from giving all children equal opportunity to learn and achieve; but with the expectation that women chose between family and their goals when they marry.

Seward (1945) surveyed 147 first-year female psychology students on their attitudes towards the evolving female role to find the most extreme liberal and extreme conservative individuals. Seward (1945) modified two inventories, Kitay's attitudes towards women and Kirkpatrick's feminism-antifeminism attitude tests. After these inventories were administered the 15 most extreme attitudes at either ends of the scales were selected for further analysis (Seward, 1945). A follow-up interview was conducted to collect background information on home life, religious affiliations, and other potentially discrepancies between the groups. Seward (1945) found that in the most extreme groups a pattern emerged, a dichotomy in female attitudes toward the single female and the married female. Women whom were single could be independent, hold down a job and support themselves. The single female was awarded greater equality with men given that they had to compete with them in the workforce (Seward, 1945). The drawback to this freedom results from the greater uncertainty in security, resulting in conflict (Seward, 1945). Conservative individuals ranked lower on the feminism scale and projected traditional attitudes toward the wife role. These attitudes included adherence to social parasitism, which involved becoming completely depended upon the husband – including social and financial matters (Seward, 1945).

Liberal women ranked higher in feminism traits than their conservative counterparts, and also came from non-traditional/nuclear homes. These homes did not typically have the father/mother dynamic and in comparison to their conservative counterparts were not particularly religious. The conservative group came from the traditional/nuclear family set up and the majority (14 out of 15 subjects) were regular church attendees (Seward, 1945). For the liberal females conflict occurs when shifting from single feminist to the role of traditional wife/subordinate and the social expectation that accompanies the role (Seward, 1945).

=== Sex Differences: Mental and Temperamental (1980) ===
Following the Sewards’ retirement in 1972, they began an active collaboration to bring their respective fields together to produce Sex Differences: Mental and Temperamental (1980). Prior to Dr. John Seward's death in 1985 a follow-up work had begun, but was never completed. Dr. John Seward's knowledge and experience with learning was combined with Dr. Georgene Seward's knowledge of social, personality and clinical psychology. The general principle of the book was to determine if sex differences were either biologically defined or socially assigned (Seward & Seward, 1980). This was particularly important because sex differences were used to justify the oppression of women and the dominance of men and infiltrated scientific objectivity through cultural experience (Seward & Seward, 1980).

Sex Differences: Mental and Temperamental (1980) is a comprehensive literature review of studies that investigated differences between male and female. The goal of Sex Differences: Mental and Temperamental was to converge the literature of different cultures, non-human animal research, historical cultures, normal and abnormal development, and learning theory into a comprehensive manifestation of sex roles. The working hypothesis of the book was based upon a couple key assumptions, the first being that sex differences were a by-product of evolution. The other assumption was that with the increased development of the human brain and its by-products (such as language, context and memory) increase humans’ ability to manipulate the environment have made some biological adaptations obsolete. The objective was an attempt to isolate sex-specific traits that were resistant to cultural change and persist as biologically ingrained dispositions (Seward & Seward, 1980).

Seward and Seward (1980) predicted that the most stable sex differences would be those most closely related to behaviours related to reproduction. Mental/cognitive processes were predicted to be less stable and subject to social expectation (Seward & Seward, 1980). Careful examination of historical and current cultures was required for the elimination or confirmation of sex differences (Seward & Seward, 1980). Historically men are more likely to interact with their environment through exploration and reconstruction, while women are more prone to interact through communications which correspond to evolutionary expectations (Seward & Seward, 1980). Seward and Seward (1980) wished to determine the extent to which biological processes corresponded to sex differences and the extent to which social expectation influence accepted sex differences.

==== Mental abilities ====
In chapter three of Sex Differences the focus was upon mental differences. The use of intellectual measures of behaviour was seen as more objective as it was often attributed to genetics or hormones. Overall intelligence differences were often related to three subsets of intelligent behaviour; verbal, numerical and spatial. The data on intelligence was in abundance, ranging in people from kindergarten to college. Seward and Seward (1980) reviewed Diane McGuiness's (1975) experimental study that had found a trend favouring females in hearing task and favouring males in sight-related tasks. Seward and Seward (1980) caution the quick conclusion of a biological aspect to the differences, instead suggesting that the differences observed were the result of biases in social roles. The development of these differences was likely the result of social biases that have risen through evolutionary history of men as providers and women as caretakers (Seward & Seward, 1980).

Studies reviewed by Seward and Seward (1980) found most consistently was females tend to perform better in all forms of communication (verbal, written or read) and infant females made more frequent vocalizations and from an earlier age. Women also typically had a more global cognitive style to their mental abilities, while men traditionally had a more analytical cognitive approach (Seward & Seward, 1980). However, evidence was arising for male dominance in spatial abilities and problem solving with a potential role of androgenic hormone. Evidence for biological innateness suggested a greater susceptibility for men because learning disorders such as dyslexia were more frequently reported (Seward & Seward, 1980). The Differentiation Hypothesis presented by Garrett (1946) suggested that all skills start out with a general ability that is specialized over time (Seward & Seward, 1980).

==== Masculinity and femininity ====
Seward and Seward (1980) explored the variations in terms of understandings of Masculine and Feminine in three distinct ways. The first was the Essential Core; religious/spiritual dichotomies such as heaven/male, earth/female, yin representing the female, negative and passive in opposite to the yang which was male, positive and active (Bakan, 1966 as cited in, Seward & Seward, 1980). Secondly there were social stereotypes of the ‘typical’ man and the ‘typical’ woman held by real men and women in cultural groups. The last was to review self-reported attitudes of people in terms of how they measured up to the stereotype. Seward and Seward (1980) found in their literature review that real men and women often mirrored the stereotype with a few variations. An example given by Seward and Seward (1980) was that women were not found to be more neurotic or suspicious than men. Stable tendencies included male characteristic of ‘toughness’ and ‘self-assertion’ and female characteristic of ‘sensitivity’ and ‘social need’ (Seward & Seward, 1980).

==== Activity ====
Seward and Seward (1980) reviewed literature on the activity levels of male and female children. From a young age (second year to puberty) male children tend to be more active than their female counterparts, with more reports of hyperactivity in male children. This statistical data helped to support biological sex differentiation component (Seward & Seward, 1980). Social Factors in Gender Development The differences in parental expectation between male and female children could have an important role upon their behaviour; however determining the extent was difficult with observational methods (Seward & Seward, 1980). These behaviours of gender development were analyzed in chapter six through a number of research studies under a number of popular paradigms of the day. These included, but not limited to; psychoanalytical, cognitive-developmental, and social learning. However the most detailed was modeling, covering research that included parental, peer and media (books and television) as sources of modelling (Seward & Seward, 1980).

==== Temperamental ====
Chapters nine to 12 deal with temperamental traits that were traditionally aligned with a particular gender. These temperamental aspects included; aggressiveness and dominance, fear and anxiety, compliance and nurturance, and need to achieve (Seward & Seward, 1980). It was acknowledged by most psychologists that men on average are more aggressive than females and females tended to be more anxious and nurturing than males (Seward & Seward, 1980). However, social learning theorists postulated that this difference was primarily the result of environmental learning/observation rather than innate biological drive; both sexes shared the same impulses, but in varying proportions (Seward & Seward, 1980). Additionally, the operant conditioning paradigm had gained momentum and psychologists’ knowledge of rewards and punishments assisted in their understanding of behaviour. However, despite this knowledge the effective rewards and punishments that strength or weaken certain behaviours in sex differences were not well understood (Seward & Seward, 1980).

== Notable publications ==
- Seward, G. H. (1944). "Psychological effects of the menstrual cycle on women workers". Psychological Bulletin. 41 (2): 90–102. doi:10.1037/h0057779.
- Seward, G (1945). "Cultural conflict and the feminine role: An experimental study". The Journal of Social Psychology. 22 (2): 177–194. doi:10.1080/00224545.1945.9921718. PMID 21007976.
- Seward, G. H. (1946). Sex and the social order. New York: McGraw Hill.
- Seward, G. H. (1956). Psychotherapy and culture conflict. New York: Ronald Press.
- Seward, G. H. (1958). Clinical studies in culture conflict. New York: Ronald Press.
- Seward, G. H. & Seward, J. P. (Eds.). (1958). Current psychological issues: Essays in honor of Robert S. Woodworth. New York: Holt.
- Seward, G. H. & Williamson, R. (Eds.). (1970). Sex roles in changing society. New York: Random House.
- Seward, G. H. (1977). "Sex roles in cross-cultural perspective". Annals of the New York Academy of Sciences. 285 (1): 612–617. Bibcode:1977NYASA.285..612S. doi:10.1111/j.1749-6632.1977.tb29383.x. S2CID 86423782.
- Seward, G. H. & Seward, J. P. (1980). Sex differences: Mental and temperamental. Lexington, MA: Lexington Books.
