= Anne Anastasi =

American psychologist

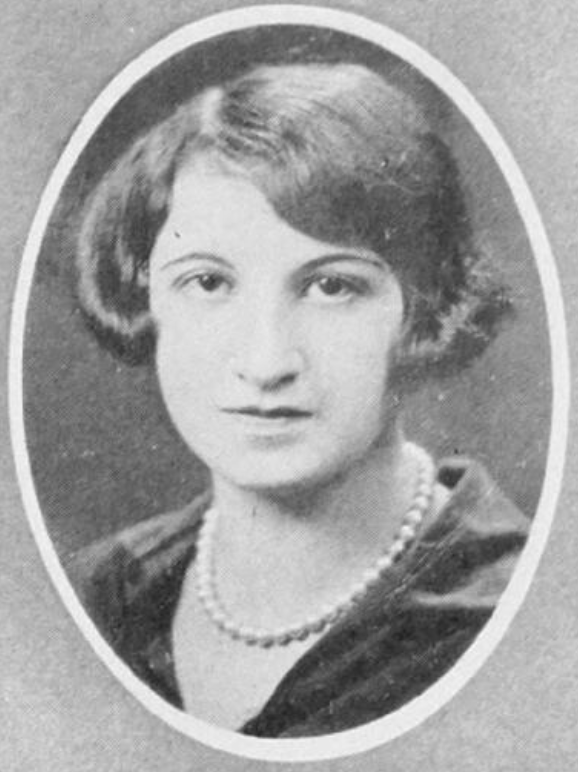
- Anne Anastasi, from the 1928 yearbook of Barnard College
- Born: December 19, 1908; New York City, New York
- Died: May 4, 2001 (aged 92); New York City, New York
- Awards: APA Career Achievement Award for Distinguished Psychological Contributions to Education (1984); APF's Gold Medal (1984); National Medal of Science (1987); James McKeen Cattell Fellow Award (1992); APA Award for Lifetime Contributions to Psychology (1994)

Academic background
- Education: Barnard College (BA, 1928); Columbia University (PhD, 1929)
- Academic advisor: Harry L. Hollingworth
- Influences: Charles Spearman

Academic work
- Discipline: Psychologist
- Sub-discipline: Psychometrics
- Institutions: Queens College; Fordham University
- Notable works: Psychological Testing

1972 American Psychological Association President
- Preceded by: Kenneth B. Clark
- Succeeded by: Leona E. Tyler

Anne Anastasi (December 19, 1908 – May 4, 2001) was an American psychologist best known for her pioneering development of psychometrics. Her generative work, Psychological Testing, remains a classic text in which she drew attention to the individual being tested and therefore to the responsibilities of the testers. She called for them to go beyond test scores, to search the assessed individual's history to help them to better understand their own results and themselves.

Known as the test guru, Anastasi focused on what she believed to be the appropriate use of psychometric tests. As stated in an obituary, "She made major conceptual contributions to the understanding of the manner in which psychological development is influenced by environmental and experiential factors. Her writings have provided incisive commentary on test construction and the proper application of psychological tests." According to Anastasi, such tests only revealed what the test-taker knows at the time; they did not explain test scores. In addition, any psychometric measurement must take into account that aptitude is context-dependent. Anastasi stressed the importance of the role of the tester to correctly select, conduct, and evaluate tests.

She was president of the American Psychological Association (APA) in 1972, the third ever woman to be elected. In 1984, she was given the American Psychological Foundation's gold medal. In 1987, she was awarded the National Medal of Science.

== Family and education ==
Anne Anastasi in her office, 1987

Anne Anastasi was born on December 19, 1908, in New York City to Anthony Anastasi and Theresa Gaudiosi Anastasi. Her father died when she was a baby, and his family did not remain in contact. She grew up with her mother, her mother's brother, and her grandmother. Theresa supported the family, eventually working for the Italian newspaper Il Progresso. Anne was homeschooled by her grandmother until sixth grade. After brief periods in public and preparatory schools, she entered Barnard College at age 15. Her interests in mathematics and psychology. She graduated from Barnard College with a bachelor's degree in psychology at age 20 in 1928, and completed a PhD in psychology at Columbia University in 1930.

Anastasi was hired by Harry Hollingworth to teach at Barnard, where she remained from 1930 to 1939. She worked at Queens College, City University of New York from 1939 to 1947, becoming chair of the department. She worked at Fordham University from 1947 to 1979, serving as chair from 1968 to 1974. She retired as a full professor in 1979, and became a professor emerita.

In 1933, Anastasi married John Porter Foley, Jr. (1910–1994), an industrial psychologist. The following year, she was diagnosed with cervical cancer. She was treated with radium, which destroyed the cancer but caused her to become infertile. During the Great Depression of the 1930s, she and her husband could only find work in different cities, she in New York and he in Washington, DC

Anastasi died in New York on May 4, 2001.

== Differential psychology ==
In 1937, Anastasi published the first edition of Differential Psychology, a pioneering work on what she defined as "the scientific study of differences between groups" Her definition encompassed not only race and ethnicity, but also group differences reflective of age, education, family, gender, religion, and social class. Her approach to the study of culture and difference has been described as an "elegant model" that incorporates a number of current fields of study with "brilliant simplicity".

Anastasi also addressed the methodological challenges involved in studying group differences. These were clearly demonstrated in the 1930s by Nazi "race science". Anastasi's summary of such work was blistering: "The array of evidence in support of this [Aryan supremacy] is incomplete and one-sided at its best, and fantastic and mythical at its worst." Between the methodological difficulties involved and the horrors perpetrated by the Nazis, differential psychology largely disappeared as a field of research. By 1954, Anastasi herself had moved from the study of group differences to that of individual differences.

Anastasi published three editions of Differential Psychology (in 1937, 1949 and 1958). In 1985 the American Psychological Foundation described it as a "classic" text and a model of "clarity, comprehensiveness, and synthesis".

== Psychological testing ==
=== Problems addressed ===
Anastasi's 1983 essay "What Do Intelligence Tests Measure?" aimed to correct misinterpretations regarding the understanding and use of aptitude and personality tests. Anastasi pointed out that the "testing boom" of the 1920s caused the term IQ to be adopted and misused by the general public. According to Anastasi, the misappropriation of the term created connotations that intelligence is heritable, stable throughout one's lifespan, and resistant to change.

In contrast, Anastasi emphasized that psychometric scores convey an individual's present status of what he or she knows. She cautioned against interpreting such tests as serving a strong predictive function, as scores only indicated to what degree a person acquired the knowledge and skills for the criterion of a given test. They evaluate for what is in high demand within a specific context; what an individual can achieve in the future depends not only on his or her present intellectual status as determined by the test, but also on subsequent experiences. Therefore, Anastasi advocated against psychometric tests definitively labelling a person, as they assess for specific types of knowledge and do not account for how intelligence can change over time.

Important to Anastasi was an understanding of the cultural frames of reference within which a test is developed. She stated that "No intelligence test can be culture free, because human intelligence is not culture free". Therefore, according to Anastasi, the first step in developing an intelligence test within a given culture was formulating a task analysis in order to determine how well individuals gain knowledge valued within that culture.

=== Methods ===
Anastasi mostly applied existing methods to individual and group ability testing, as well as self-report inventories and measuring interests and attitudes. She followed the methodological principles of norms, reliability, validity, and item analysis. The essay "Psychological Testing: Basic Concepts and Common Misconceptions," encapsulates Anastasi's methodological positions. Anastasi stressed that, in order to evaluate any psychometric test, the tester must be knowledgeable of the main features of the tests, particularly as they apply to norms, validity, and reliability. Her approach to standard scores and standard deviation was one in which she believed that understanding statistical concepts was essential to understanding the meaning of statistical computation.

In regards to criterion-referenced tests, Anastasi diverged from educational psychologist Robert Glaser, who first introduced the concept in 1963. Instead of approaching such tests as fundamentally different from norm-referenced tests, Anastasi maintained that the two could be combined to give a more comprehensive evaluation of the individual's test performance. An example is the Stanford Diagnostic Test in reading and mathematics, which assesses specific subject mastery by combining both interpretations.

Anastasi recognized that there are many types of test reliability. However, when dealing with standardized testing, much of the variance in reliability can be minimized by controlling such conditions as the testing environment, rapport, instructions, and time limits.

In contrast with the belief that there are three kinds of validity - content validity, criterion validity, and construct validity - Anastasi espoused to the then-growing belief of the mid-1980s that many more procedures could be used to build validity into a test. Defining the constructs to be assessed initiates the validation process. It culminates with "validating and cross-validating various scores through statistical analyses against external, real-life criteria".

=== Difference between aptitude and achievement test ===
In Psychological Testing: Basic Concepts and Common Misconceptions, Anastasi clarified differences between types of tests. Two differences between aptitude tests and achievement tests are test use and the degree of experiential specificity forming the foundation of the tests' construction. Achievement tests are used to assess current status; aptitude tests can predict future performance as defined by their specific criteria. Experiential specificity is narrowly defined for achievement tests, such as SAT Subject Tests. In contrast, the Stanford-Binet Intelligence Scales aptitude tests are based on broad knowledge of American culture beginning in the twentieth century.

=== Theoretical stance ===
Anastasi's theoretical framework that ability or intelligence change with experience and that their cultural context dictates their parameters informed her methodological approach to psychometric testing. Tests should be selected and used while bearing in mind their contextual appropriateness and limitations. She emphasized that tests serve specific functions in Western society, such as school/occupational placement or to assess for mental disabilities.

=== Criticism ===
The 1955 first edition of Psychological Testing was criticized for attributing test results only to individual differences, instead of recognizing that "'occasional differences' are also measured by means of tests". In the latest edition of the book, Anastasi and her co-author Susana Urbina suggested that more accurate results can be obtained by combining information from several fairly homogeneous tests. Each one would cover a single trait, or different aspect of the criterion.

== Legacy ==
APA Division 5: Quantitative and Qualitative Methods awards the Anne Anastasi Dissertation Award.
