= Theodora Mead Abel =

American clinical psychologist and educator

- Born: Theodora Mead; September 9, 1899; Newport, Rhode Island, U.S.
- Died: December 2, 1998 (aged 99); Forestburgh, New York, U.S.
- Education: Vassar College (AB); Columbia University (MA, PhD); University of Paris
- Occupations: Clinical psychologist; educator; writer
- Spouse: Theodore Abel
- Children: 3
- Writing career
- Notable works: The Subnormal Adolescent Girl, Facial Disfigurement, Psychological Testing in Cultural Contexts, Culture and Psychotherapy

Theodora Mead Abel (September 9, 1899 – December 2, 1998) was an American clinical psychologist and educator, who used innovative ideas by combining sociology and psychology. She was a pioneer in cross-cultural psychology.

== Early life and education ==
Theodora Mead was born in Newport, Rhode Island, on September 9, 1899, and raised in New York City. In 1917, she graduated from Miss Chapin's School, where she was president of the student government.

Abel attended Vassar College and received her B.A. in 1921. In 1924, she received an M.A. from Columbia University, where one of her professors was Leta Stetter Hollingworth. She then attended the University of Paris and obtained her degree in psychology in 1923. Her final degree came from Columbia and was a Ph.D., in 1925.

== Career ==
After receiving her education, Theodora spent time as an educator. She taught at the University of Illinois Urbana-Champaign (1925–1926), Sarah Lawrence College (1929–1933), and the Manhattan Trade School for Girls.

She then entered the civil world. She worked at the New York State Department of Mental Hygiene from 1940 until 1946, as its chief psychologist. In 1947, she took the position of director of psychology at New York City's Postgraduate Center for Mental Health, a position she held for 24 years.

In 1971, after moving to New Mexico, she became chief of family therapy at the Child Guidance Center, in Albuquerque, where she also established a private practice. While in New Mexico, she conducted studies of Puebloan peoples.

She wrote many books including:

- The Subnormal Adolescent Girl (1940)
- Facial Disfigurement (1952)
- Psychological Testing in Cultural Contexts (1973)
- Culture and Psychotherapy (1974)

The last of these four books includes an introduction by Margaret Mead, whom Abel had met during graduate school at Columbia. They became friends after lining up alphabetically (both had the last name "Mead" but they were not related).

== Passing ==
Abel died in Forestburgh, New York, on December 2, 1998, aged 99.

Her husband, Theodore Abel, had died in 1988. They were survived by two daughters Caroline (Abel) Lalire and Zita (Abel) Emerson and a son Peter Abel, plus grandchildren and great-grandchildren.
