= Henrietta Rodman =

American educator and feminist (1877–1923)

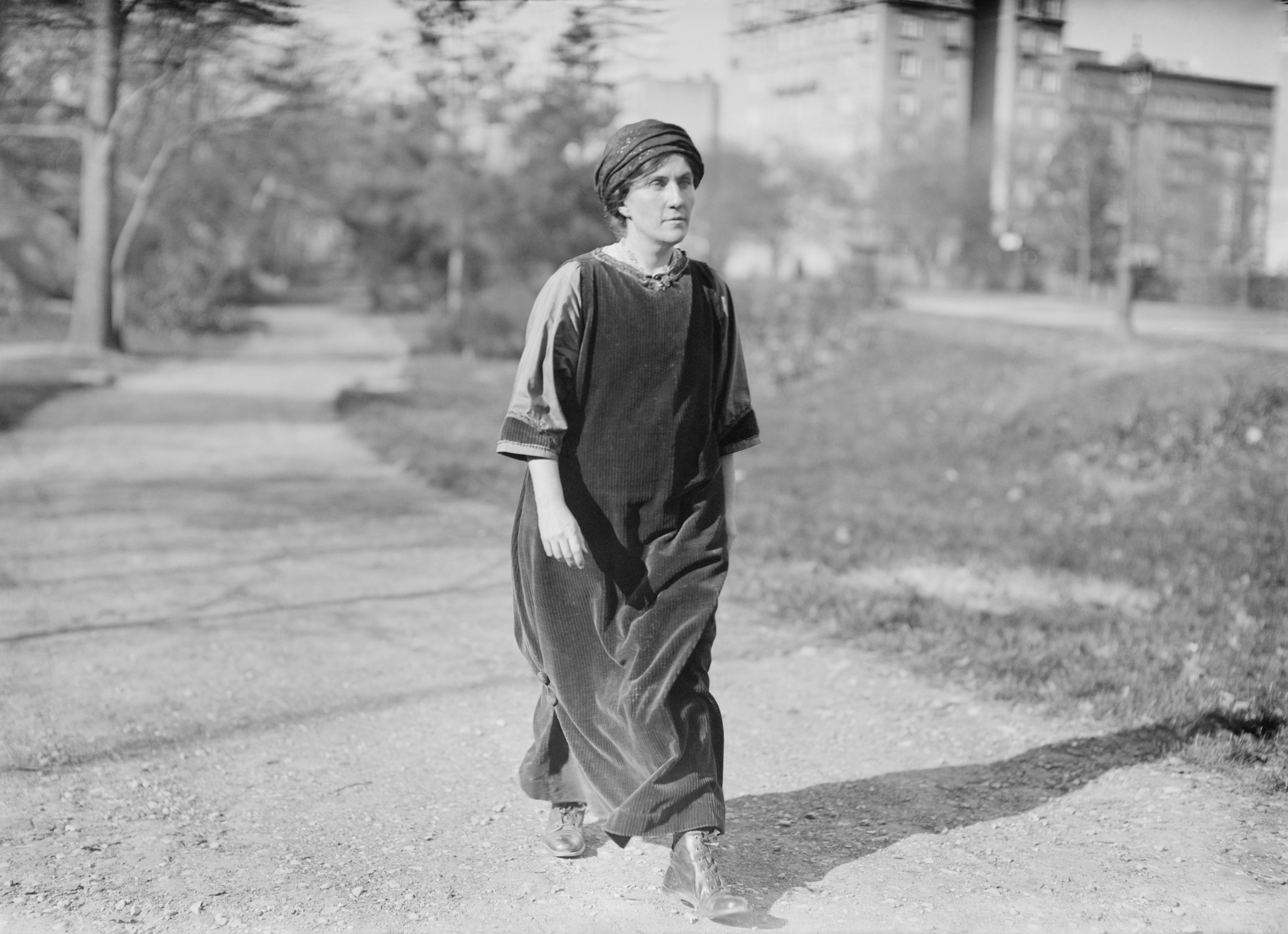
- Born: August 29, 1877; Astoria, New York City, U.S.
- Died: March 21, 1923 (aged 45)
- Other name: Mrs. De Fremery
- Occupation: Educator
- Known for: Feminist and labor activism
- Spouse: Herman de Fremery (m. 1913)

Henrietta Rodman (August 29, 1877 – March 21, 1923) was an American educator and feminist. She was active in advocating on behalf of married women teachers for their right to promotion and maternity leave.

== Early life and education ==
Rodman was born in Astoria, New York, the daughter of Rev. Washington Rodman and Henrietta Blackwell Rodman. Her father was a Protestant Episcopal clergyman in West Farms, Bronx, and founder of St. Barnabas Hospital in the Bronx. She was a 1904 graduate of Teachers College, Columbia University.

== Career ==
Rodman taught English and was a vocational counselor at Wadleigh High School for Girls in New York City. Opposed to the school board's restrictive policies on married women teachers, she married a psychologist friend, Herman de Fremery (a.k.a. Herman Defrem), in February 1913, and announced it to the press, saying, "If the married state affects a woman's work, the authorities can mark her accordingly. If it does not affect her work, and if she is as good a teacher as she was before, she deserves promotion, if it comes to her." She also referred to the Board of Education, in print, as "mother baiters." She was suspended according to New York City Board of Education policy; a well-publicized and lengthy appeal followed, serving Rodman's purpose by keeping the issue in headlines.

Rodman was a member of the Liberal Club and of Heterodoxy. She agitated in the Liberal Club for the inclusion of African-American members, and for support of feminist causes; in 1913 she was successful in leading the relocation of the Liberal Club to MacDougal Street in Greenwich Village.

In 1914, Rodman formed the Feminist Alliance, uniting several feminist causes to work together. Rodman took special interest in the collective housing, childcare, and communal kitchens, following the writings of Charlotte Perkins Gilman. She made serious plans for an apartment building to demonstrate those feminist principles, hiring an architect and rounding up financial backers, but stiff opposition and the onset of war scuttled any chance of success.

During World War I, she was a member of the executive board of the Woman's Peace Party, and wrote and lectured on pacifism.

== Personal life ==
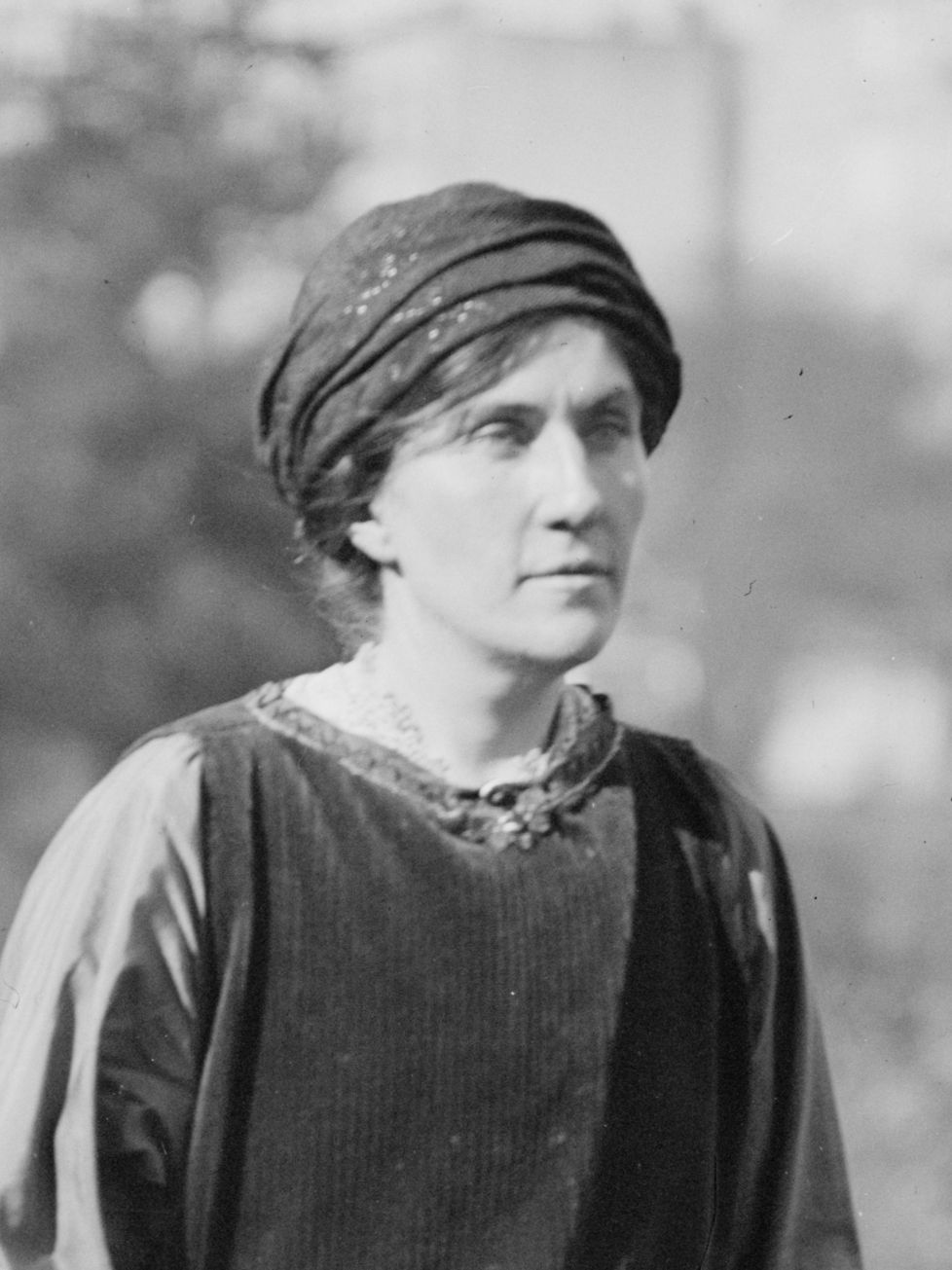
Henrietta Rodman between 1910 and 1915

Playwright Floyd Dell said that Rodman "had an extraordinary gift for stirring things up. Incredibly naïve, preposterously reckless, believing wistfully in beauty and goodness, a Candide in petticoats and sandals." Her bohemian public persona was considered eccentric at best: she wore sack-like dresses and sandals long before they were in fashion; her hair was bobbed; she smoked cigarettes. She threw crowded dinner parties in her top-floor apartment; Mary Austin recalled attending one such dinner, and meeting James Weldon Johnson there. Margaret Sanger also remembered attending a tea hosted by Henrietta Rodman, whom she called "Feminist of Feminists", in Rodman's Greenwich Village apartment.

During her marriage to Herman de Fremery, the couple lived with Herman's earlier common-law wife, in an apartment on Bank Street.

Rodman adopted two children and was known as "Mrs. Rodman" in her personal life. She died after unsuccessful surgery for a brain tumor in March 1923, at age 45.
