= Feminist Alliance =

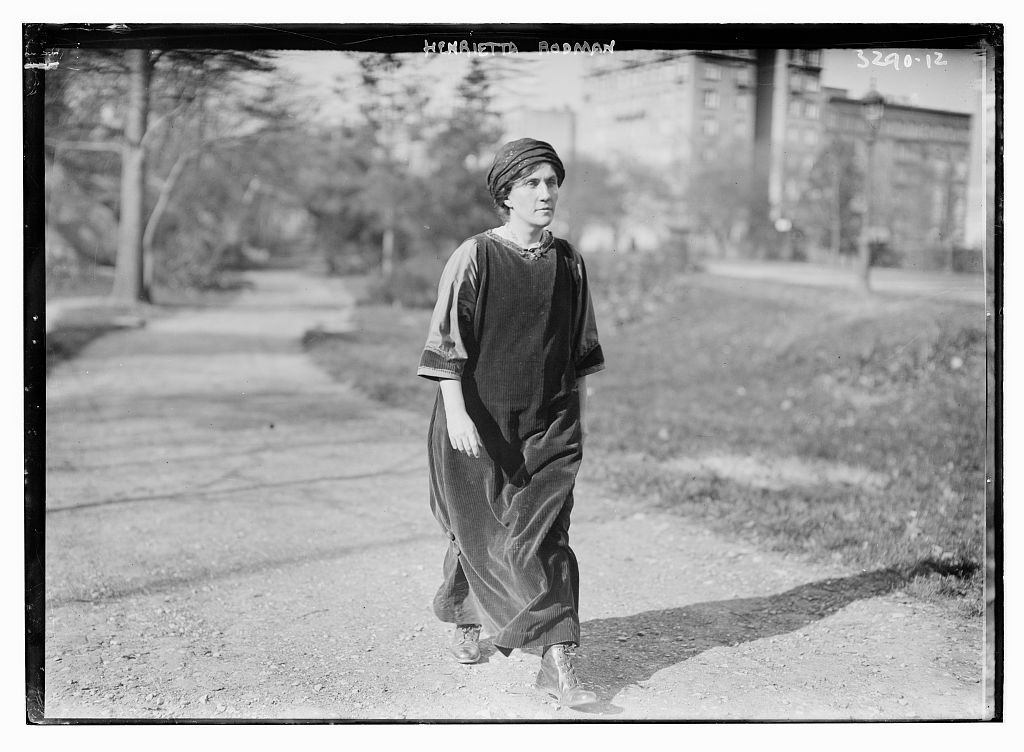
- Formation: 1914
- Purpose: To support equal rights for women
- Key people: Henrietta Rodman

The Feminist Alliance was a progressive era organization founded in 1914 by feminist activist Henrietta Rodman and her husband, Herman de Fremery, a professor at Columbia University.

== Creation of the Feminist Alliance ==
Henrietta Rodman and Herman de Fremery created the Feminist Alliance in 1914. Leta Hollingworth served on the board and the organization had more than fifty members. The group frequently worked with women from the feminist group Heterodoxy.

== Political campaigns ==
=== Co-operative living ===
The Feminist Alliance worked to create an apartment house where families could live together and share the workload. According to Marie Dille of the Fall River Globe who reported on this movement, the apartment was for "...married professional women who have achieved such success as to desire continuing their work after marriage."

=== Equality in the workplace ===
The Feminist Alliance was an important organization in the campaign for equal rights for women in the workforce. In October 1914, the group advocated for the right for pregnant women to continue to work as school teachers. As part of this campaign, they submitted a letter to the Superintendent that was signed by Charlotte Perkins Gilman, Fola La Folette and Crystal Eastman as well as many others.

=== Support for constitutional gender equality ===
The Feminist Alliance supported constitutional gender equality as early as the 1910s, even before the Equal Rights Amendment was first proposed in Congress in 1923.

=== Immigration ===
In 1914, the Feminist Alliance supported the Thompson Bill proposed in the senate by Senator Thompson which would allow women who married non-U.S. citizens to maintain their citizenship.

=== Women's suffrage ===
Many women affiliated with the Feminist Alliance were suffragists. In April of 1914, the group sent a letter to President Woodrow Wilson calling on him to support a federal amendment to the U.S. Constitution granting women the right to vote.

== Members ==
- Edna Bryner
- Leta Hollingsworth
- Rebecca Hourwich
- Henrietta Rodman
- Florence Wise
