= Theodore Fred Abel =

Polish-American Sociologist

- Born: November 24, 1896; Łódź, Russian Empire
- Died: March 23, 1988 (aged 91); Albuquerque, New Mexico, U.S.
- Education: Columbia University (MA, PhD)
- Occupation: Sociology professor
- Known for: Theodore Abel papers, the largest archive of 1st person accounts of people who joined National Socialist movement in Germany (The Nazi Party)
- Notable work: “Why Hitler Came To Power” published in 1938
- Spouse: Theodora Abel

Theodore Fred Abel (November 24, 1896 – March 23, 1988) was an American sociology professor who collected the largest single archive of first person accounts from people who joined Hitler's National Socialist movement. The collection of men's accounts was published in 1938 in a book titled Why Hitler Came to Power. The women's accounts were set aside to publish at a later date. Those accounts were lost and then rediscovered in the archives of the Hoover Institute in Palo Alto, after which three Florida State University professors arranged to have them transcribed, translated and digitized. This collection of first person accounts from Nazis before the start of World War II are called the "Theodore Abel papers."

== Education and early years ==
Theodore Abel was born in Łódź, Russian Empire (Russian partition of Poland) on November 24, 1896. He died in Albuquerque, New Mexico on March 23, 1988.

After Abel moved to the United States, he earned an MA degree in 1925 and his PhD in 1929 from Columbia University. Abel's first teaching position was as an assistant professor of sociology at the University of Illinois at Urbana in 1925. In 1929, Abel took a position as associate professor of sociology at Columbia University. In 1934 Abel traveled to Germany to implement and oversee the writing contest that would later result in the documents collected in the Theodore Abel Papers. Abel stayed at Columbia until 1950. He became a full professor of sociology at Hunter College of the City University of New York in 1950 and retired in 1967.

== Theodore Abel papers ==
In 1934, as an assistant professor of sociology at Columbia University, Abel offered cash prizes for “the best personal life story of a supporter of the Hitler movement.” In order to qualify, participants had to have been party members before January 1, 1933.

Around a year after Hitler became chancellor, Theodore Abel wanted to know what had motivated so many people to support him. After Abel failed to get any of the estimated 850,000 Nazi Party members to agree to an interview, he came up with the idea for a fake competition, where he offered a cash prize to whoever could write the most beautiful, detailed description of why they had joined the Nazi Party....At the time, the prize money was worth more than half the monthly average salary in Germany, and even Joseph Goebbels—the Nazi minister of propaganda—publicly supported the contest. The submissions ranged from handwritten love letters to Nazism, to 12-page testimonies, while participants represented a cross section of German society, from soldiers and SS officers to office workers, housewives, children, and miners.

Among the recurring themes of the letters were people who were hoping Hitler would bring back order and their distrust of the press due to the press being what they considered overcritical of Hitler and his ideas. The women's accounts are especially interesting given the historical context of German's Women's movements at the time.

Top-quality high schools for girls had existed since the 1870s, and German universities were opened to women at the beginning of the 20th century. Many German women became teachers, lawyers, doctors, journalists and novelists. In 1919, German women got the vote. By 1933, women, of whom there were millions more than men – Berlin had 1,116 women for every 1,000 men – voted in roughly the same percentages as men for Hitler and National Socialist candidates.

== Published works ==
- Protestant Home Missions to Catholic Immigrants, Harper, 1933
- Why Hitler Came Into Power, Prentice-Hall, 1938 (Editor)
- Freedom and Control in Modern Society, Van Nostrand, 1954
- Systematic Sociology in Germany, Octagon, 1966
- The Nazi Movement, Atherton, 1967
- The Foundation of Sociological Theory, Random House, 1970
