= Harry L. Hollingworth =

Harry Levi Hollingworth
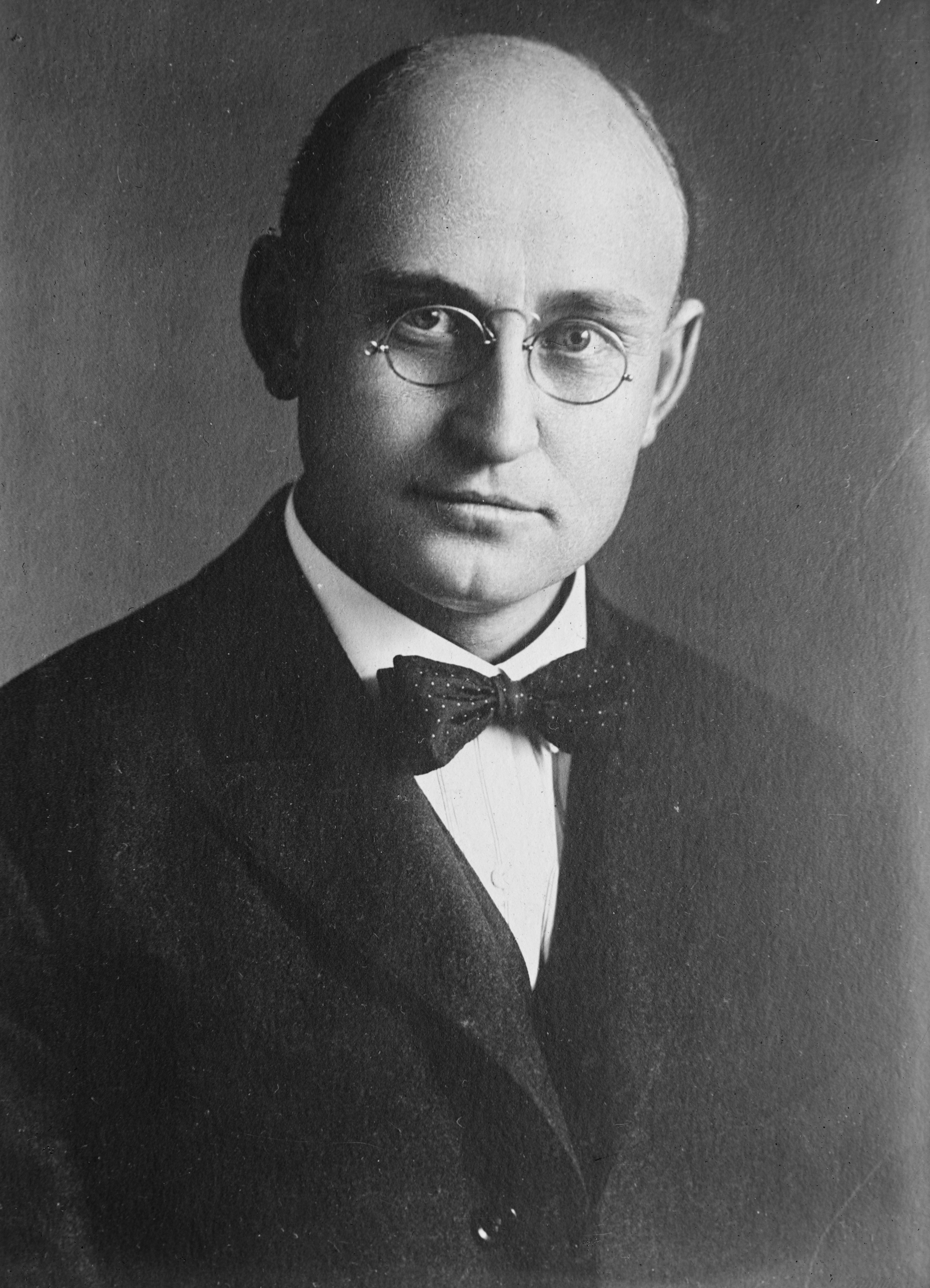
- Hollingworth in 1919

36th President of the American Psychological Association
- In office 1927–1928
- Preceded by: Harvey A. Carr
- Succeeded by: Edwin Garrigues Boring

Personal details
- Born: May 26, 1880 De Witt, Nebraska, U.S.
- Died: September 17, 1956 (aged 76) Montrose, New York, U.S.
- Spouse: Leta Stetter
- Scientific career
- Notable students: Anne Anastasi

Harry Levi Hollingworth (May 26, 1880 – September 17, 1956) was one of the first psychologists to bring psychology into the advertising world, as well as a pioneer in applied psychology.

== Biography ==
Hollingworth was born on May 26, 1880, in De Witt, Nebraska. Hollingworth graduated from high school at age 16, but lacking both the necessary two years of college preparatory work and the funds for university Hollingworth applied for a teaching certificate instead of pursuing a university education. After teaching for two years Hollingworth enrolled in preparatory school. As a result of these educational delays Hollingworth was 23 when he finally enrolled as a freshman at the University of Nebraska.

Although Hollingworth wished to study philosophy or psychology at graduate school he received no offers for an assistantship and instead found himself as the principal of a high school. However, he received an offer of an assistantship from James McKeen Cattell at Columbia University within a few months of his taking on the position. In 1908 Hollingworth’s fiancé, Leta Stetter Hollingworth, who up until now had been living in Nebraska, joined him in New York where the two were married. The following year he received his doctorate from Columbia, having completed his dissertation on the accuracy of reaching.

Following his graduation Hollingworth took an instructor’s position at Barnard College, teaching psychology and logic. Short on funds, Hollingworth took extra jobs wherever he could, including proctoring exams and delivering a series of lectures to the New York Men’s Advertising League on the psychology of advertising. In 1911 Hollingworth received a job offer that alleviated his financial concerns, and allowed his wife to enroll in graduate school.

The Coca-Cola Company, facing a lawsuit from the federal government under the Pure Food and Drug Act, approached Hollingworth (after James McKeen Cattell and several other psychologists turned them down) about investigating the psychological effects of caffeine on humans. Aware of the stigma associated with applied work, as well as possible concerns about the scientific integrity of research funded by a corporation, Hollingworth included several conditions in his contract with Coca-Cola. Specifically, Hollingworth stated that Coca-Cola could not use the results of his research in its advertisements, nor could Hollingworth’s name or that of Columbia University be used in these ads. Additionally, Hollingworth was free to publish the results of his research regardless of the outcome of the study. Furthermore, to reduce any questions about the integrity of his research Hollingworth designed his three caffeine studies to include blind and double-blind conditions. The scope and methodology employed in these studies had never before been seen applied to psychological research.

These studies generated a huge amount of data which, because of Hollingworth’s “catastrophobia,” had to be duplicated following each night’s analysis and housed in a separate location. After completing his studies Hollingworth traveled to Chattanooga to testify at the Coca-Cola trial. Here he presented the results of his studies where he had found no deleterious effects on motor or mental performance. Although Hollingworth’s testimony was well received, and the case against Coca-Cola was ultimately dismissed, the dismissal was not a result of his testimony. Following Hollingworth’s testimony at the trial, and the favourable media coverage that accompanied it, he received an incredible number of requests for further applied work.

During World War I Hollingworth was asked by the Surgeon General’s Office to administer psychological services to shell-shocked soldiers who returned from the war. From his observations of these men Hollingworth developed a theory of functional neurosis, which he published in 1920 in one of the first books on clinical psychology, The Psychology of Functional Neurosis. In 1927 Hollingworth was elected president of the American Psychological Association. Hollingworth was also a prolific writer, publishing what essentially amounted to a book a year between 1926 and 1935. Although Hollingworth wrote his autobiography in 1940 it was never published. In the late 1930s Hollingworth returned to applied research as a favor to a friend, investigating the reasons why people chew gum.

Hollingworth spent most of his career doing applied research in what, at that time, was termed business psychology, and would be better characterized today as industrial psychology. Although he was a pioneer in the fields of industrial and applied psychology, Hollingworth had no particular passion for this kind of research. Rather, Hollingworth’s career took the course it did because the financial rewards offered by applied research appealed to a man struggling to make a living (Benjamin, 1996; Benjamin, Rogers & Rosenbaum, 1991).

He died on September 17, 1956, in Montrose, New York.
