= Locking pliers =

Clamping hand tool

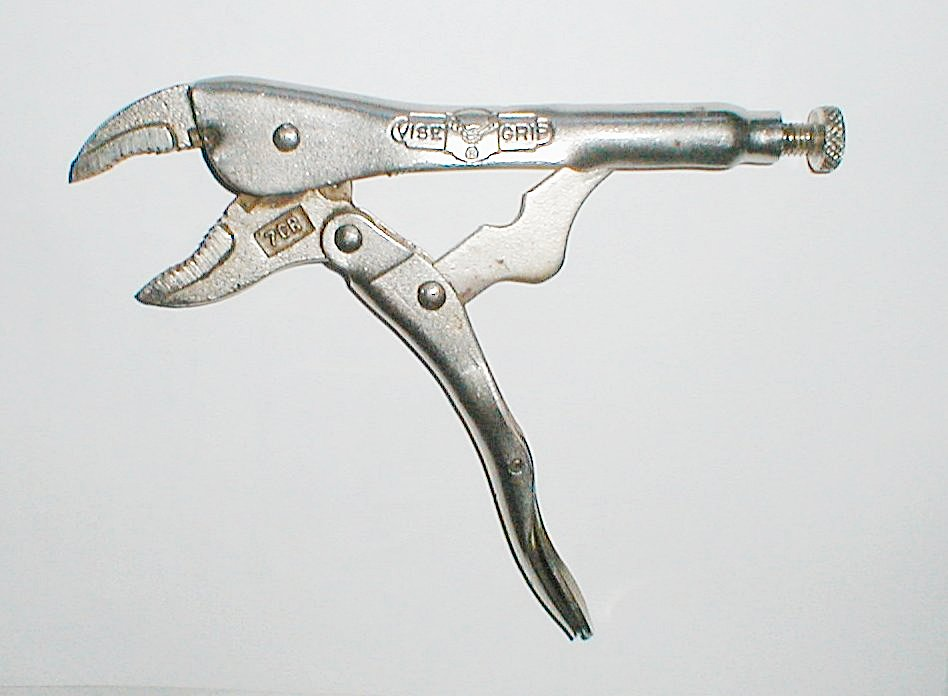
A historic version of the Vise-Grip brand locking pliers

Locking pliers (also called Vise-Grips, Vice Grips, Mole wrench or Mole grips) are pliers that can be locked into position, using a bistable cam action. Locking pliers are available with many different jaw styles, such as needle-nose pliers, wrenches, clamps and various shapes to fix metal parts for welding. They also come in many sizes.

== History ==
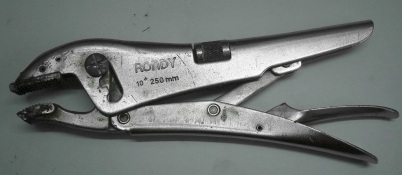
Some locking pliers have a lever (on lower arm, right) to aid release from the locked position

The first locking pliers, with the trade name Vise-Grip, were invented by William S. Petersen in De Witt, Nebraska, United States in 1924.

Later, in 1955, in the United Kingdom, M.K. Mole and Son, a hand tool manufacturing company, under the managing direction of Tom Coughtrie, began making nearly identical pliers.

== Etymology ==
In the United States, the brand name "Vise-Grips" is close to a generic name for this type of pliers. The same is true in the United Kingdom of the brand name "Mole Wrench".

The spelling "vise" is mentioned in Samuel Johnson's 1755 dictionary. This spelling is orthodox in the United States.

The spelling "vice" can be traced back to 1584, for the clamping sense of the word. This is the current spelling in the English speaking world except for the United States.

== Mechanism ==
Locking pliers remain clamped to an object without requiring continuous pressure on the handles based on the "over-center" principle. After being properly adjusted using a threaded screw, the pliers are brought to bear by cam action. In the process of being closed on an object the mechanism passes through a point of maximum tightest clamping and as the handle levers are closed further, the jaws release slightly. This means that to open the jaws they have to be tightened, thus maintaining the clamping pressure. The inherent flexibility of the pliers maintains a spring pressure on the jaws such that the handle needs to be pulled open to release the clamping pressure. In many modern versions an additional inner lever aids release.

== Operation ==
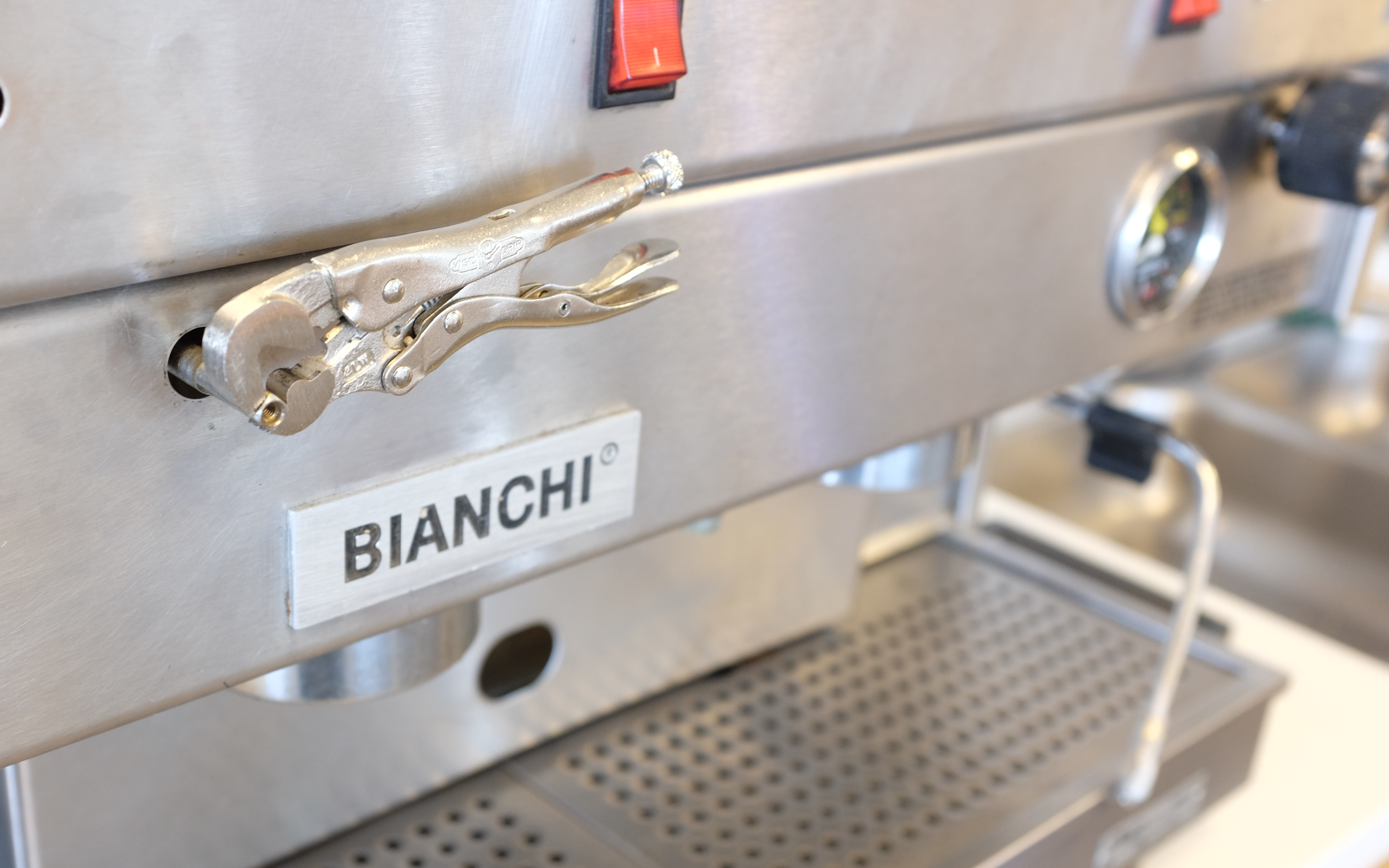
Locking pliers being used as a substitute knob on an espresso machine.

The bolt is used to set the jaws to a size slightly smaller than what is to be gripped. The jaws are then closed on the gripped object.

Because of the lever action the jaws move only slightly but with much force. Locking pliers have four advantages:

- Their lever action is stronger than that of ordinary pliers, so they can apply much more force;
- Even though they can apply more force, they do so in a very controlled manner; this is because the jaws will never close beyond the set point;
- The closing point and with it the force that is applied on the gripped object can be finely controlled;
- When they are closed they remain closed on their own until manually released, in many modern versions using a supplementary lever on the lower handle.

A typical use would be to hold metal parts in place for welding. Other uses include holding a nut or bolt that has been 'rounded', helping pull out nails, holding pipes without squeezing them, and acting as temporary substitute levers or knobs on equipment and machinery.
