= Coughtry =

Coughtry is a surname. Notable people with the surname include:

- Graham Coughtry (1931–1999), Canadian painter
- Marlan Coughtry (1934–2016), American baseball player

== See also ==
- Coughtrie
