= Leta Stetter Hollingworth =

American psychologist (1886–1939)

Leta Hollingworth
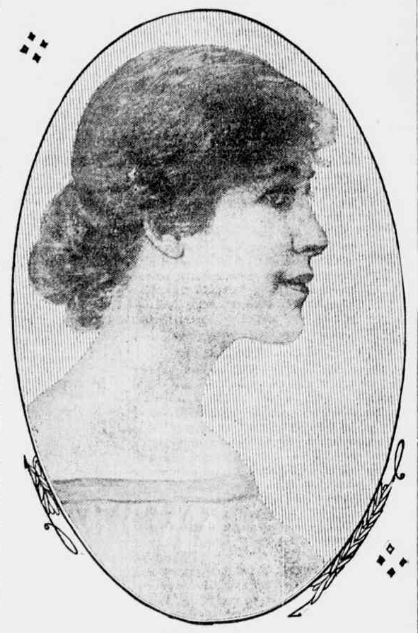
- Hollingworth in 1915
- Born: Leta Anna Stetter; May 25, 1886; Chadron, Nebraska, U.S.
- Died: November 27, 1939 (aged 53); Columbia University Medical Center; Manhattan, New York City, U.S.
- Education: University of Nebraska (1905)
- Scientific career
- Fields: Psychology
- Workplaces: Teachers College, Columbia University
- Doctoral advisor: Edward Thorndike
- Notable students: Florence Goodenough Theodora Mead Abel

Leta Stetter Hollingworth (May 25, 1886 – November 27, 1939) was an American psychologist, educator, and feminist. She made contributions in psychology of women, clinical psychology, and educational psychology. She is best known for her work with gifted children.

== Early life ==
On May 25, 1886, Leta Anna Stetter was born in Dawes County, Nebraska near the town of Chadron. She was the first of three children born to Margaret Elinor Danley (1862–1890) and John George Stetter (1856–1943).

Her childhood consisted of multiple hardships. At three years old, her mother died after giving birth to her third child, and her father deserted the family. Leta and her sisters were then raised by their maternal grandparents — Samuel Thomas Danley (1833–1898) and Mary (1838–1904) — on their farm. After ten years of absence, Leta's father remarried and forced the children to leave their grandparents and move to Valentine, Nebraska, to live with him and their stepmother. Leta described the experience of living there as a "fiery furnace" due, in part, to the alcoholism that plagued the household and the verbal and emotional abuse inflicted upon the children by their stepmother.

School was her only refuge from this abusive home life. Leta described her early education as a one-room school house where she received excellent individualized learning. Leta then attended Valentine High School, where she excelled in the classroom and discovered her talent and passion for writing. Her overall intelligence, wit, and humor were made evident when she was hired at age fifteen to write. She wrote weekly columns in the town newspaper, The Valentine Democrat. She left home in 1902, when she graduated from Valentine High School.

=== College ===
At age 16, she enrolled at the University of Nebraska. She originally studied literature and writing, as she aspired to be a writer. However, her series of short stories were never published due to her being female. She was the literary editor of The Daily Nebraskan, associate editor of The Sombrero, and assistant editor of The Senior Book.

During her time at the University of Nebraska, she met and became engaged to Harry Hollingworth; the two would wed on December 31, 1908. Harry Hollingworth moved to New York to do graduate work at Columbia University and completed his doctorate under James Cattell. Stetter stayed behind in Nebraska to finish her undergraduate studies. She graduated with Phi Beta Kappa honors in 1906, and received her Bachelor of Arts degree, along with a State Teacher's Certificate. This qualified her to teach English Language and Literature in any Nebraska public high school.

=== Early career and marriage ===
Leta started her professional career as a teacher at two high schools in Nebraska. The first of these was in DeWitt, Nebraska, Harry Hollingworth's hometown. She was the assistant principal of the high school for one year. Her second teaching position, which lasted for two years, was in the town of McCook. She flourished at these jobs before moving to New York, where her fiancé was finishing up his doctorate under Cattell. When he obtained an assistant professorship at Barnard College, Harry was able to afford to move Leta to New York with him. They were married on December 31, 1908.

Leta Hollingworth intended on teaching in New York, but soon discovered that the city had a policy stating that married women were not allowed to teach. She continued writing and busied herself with housework, yet this proved to be unrewarding and she found herself bored, frustrated, and beginning to develop depression. It was difficult to bear the fact that, despite her training, she was unable to contribute financially. She tried to go on to graduate school but was barred due to gender discrimination at the time. She began to question the role society expected of women and the inequality of women's opportunities. As a result, her career interests changed to education and sociology.

Her luck turned around in 1911, when Harry was offered a position in Coca Cola to conduct a study on caffeine. Harry hired Leta as his research assistant, and she was able to obtain enough money to attend graduate school at Columbia University and the Teachers College. In 1913, she received her master's degree in education at Columbia and began working for the Clearing House for Mental Defectives to administer Binet intelligence tests in 1914. She quickly became the top scorer, and New York City's first civil service psychologist while filling a post at Bellevue Hospital as chief of the psychological lab. Hollingworth continued on her academic journey to study educational psychology under the supervision of Edward L. Thorndike. During this decade Leta also fought for women's suffrage and belonged to the progressive era group the Feminist Alliance.

== Interests in clinical psychology ==
After receiving her M.Ed., she began part-time work at the Clearing House for Mental Defectives. It was her job to administer Binet intelligence tests. She had to teach herself how to administer them due to a lack of experience. The Civil Service began to supervise the administration of the tests in 1914, and demanded that examiners take competitive exams to determine their capability. Leta Hollingworth scored well and filled the position as the first psychologist under Civil Service in New York.

From there, she went on to work at the Bellevue Hospital Center. She was offered the position of chief at the psychological lab. She completed her doctoral work at Columbia under Edward L. Thorndike, while maintaining the position of consulting psychologist for the New York Police Department. In 1916 she received her Ph.D. and was promptly offered a teaching position at Columbia Teacher's College. She remained there for the rest of her life.

Although Hollingworth began teaching, she continued to devote at least one day out of the week to work at Bellevue Hospital. There she helped establish the Classification Clinic for Adolescents, as well as the American Association of Clinical Psychologists. She was involved in developing the ethical guidelines for clinical psychology and in promoting universal standards for training in clinical psychology. Along with her teaching duties, she also trained clinical psychologists and was the principal of the School of Exceptional Children at Bellevue.

== Intelligence testing, mental defects and exceptional children ==
In the 1920s, Hollingworth's interests shifted to the study of children, especially those with mental gifts. Due to the efforts of Lewis Madison Terman and his associates, intelligence testing and ability grouping had made their way into public schools as common practices by the 1930s. Terman believed that such intelligence testing was crucial for identifying gifted individuals so that they would receive special attention, be helped to reach their full potential, and become strong members of society. He believed that democracy would benefit from differentiating between the educational experiences of these gifted individuals and the educational experiences of non-gifted individuals. Although he believed strongly in these ideas, Terman spent little time making concrete suggestions to change school curriculums in order to meet the specific needs of gifted children.

Leta Stetter Hollingworth, however, was active in developing educational strategies concerning the development of gifted students. Much of her work was conducted at the same time as Terman's and although the two never met, they had great respect for each other. Even though many of their views overlapped, the two did disagree on a major point. Terman believed that intelligence was an inheritable trait, and focused only on defining and describing it. While Hollingworth acknowledged the role of inheritance, she also believed that environmental and educational factors had an effect on intelligence's potential. As a result of this belief, she was more interested in how to properly nurture gifted children and their education.

Her work of administering Binet intelligence tests at the Clearing House primed her for work with the gifted and the mentally challenged alike. She learned through working with children labelled as "mentally defective" that many of them actually had normal intelligence, but suffered from adjustment problems during adolescence. From this discovery she began to focus more on this population. She published several books on the topic: The Psychology of Subnormal Children (1920), Special Talents and Defects (1923) and The Psychology of the Adolescent (1928).

The last of these became a leading textbook for the following two decades, replacing one written by G. Stanley Hall. Several magazines noted the importance of the book and published excerpts from the chapter, "Psychology Weaning." The book gives several examples of successful completion of this psychological process, in order to guide puzzled parents and aid them with their children. She describes it as similar to the "physical weaning from infantile methods of taking food, it may be attended by emotional outbursts or depressions, which are likely to come upon people whenever habits have to be broken." Additional writing done on children with mental defects can be found in her books, The Problem of Mental Disorder (1934) and in Psychology of Special Disability in Spelling (1918). She even wrote her own textbooks for the classes she taught at Columbia.

It was not until the 1920s that she began to earnestly work with gifted children. She is known for coining the term “gifted” even though she primarily began her work with the “mentally defective”. Hollingworth believed that there were certain ways to nurture giftedness and educate gifted children. “Gifted Children”, written by Hollingworth in 1926, describes the results of her study in an attempt to quantify the family backgrounds, psychological composition, and temperamental, social, and physical traits of gifted children. It also includes her attempt to create a curriculum to benefit young children with IQs over 155.

The last of her publications was “Children Above 180 IQ” in 1942, which was actually completed by her husband after her death, and which observed how many children with such high IQs often had adjustment problems that seemed to arise from both a lack of intellectual stimulation and a general parental neglect. Proper resources and educational opportunities did not exist for them: the zeitgeist of the time was that, "the bright can take care of themselves." Hollingworth was able to devise a method of working with such individuals that stressed the importance of maintaining and keeping contact with them every day. They needed to be identified early in their lives as being gifted, as well as not kept isolated from other children and peers. Their needs were not being met by the average school systems, which needed to be addressed.

Her first long-term study of the gifted began in 1922 in New York. Hollingworth used a group of fifty children, aged between seven and nine years old, who all had recorded IQs over 155. They were studied over the course of three years, with two goals in mind. The first was to gain a better understanding of as many aspects of these children as possible. This included information on their backgrounds, family life and circumstances, their psychological states and makeup, and also their physical, temperamental and social traits. The second goal was to gain insights as to what the best curriculum for these children would be. The results of this study are published in her book Gifted Children (1926). She continued to stay in contact with the children long after the completion of the study. During the eighteen years that followed she added information about the spouses and offspring of the original participants to the study and results.

Another experiment with gifted children took place in 1936. Children with educational problems from the Speyer School were used in the study. The population was similar to her first study, yet special attention was paid to the racial mixture of the group. It was modeled after typical New York public school demographics. The school became known as, "Leta Hollingworth's school for bright children," and received a great deal of public attention. The curriculum that was utilized was called the "Evolution of Common Things". Hollingworth had devised it. She discovered that the children wanted to explore the world around them. As a result, the curriculum consisted of learning about such things as food, clothing, shelter, transport, tools, time keeping and communication. The children made work units which were made up of learning materials each student had provided. This model of learning proved to be more beneficial to the gifted youth than simply introducing them to advanced subjects that they would later encounter in higher levels of learning.

Hollingworth's final study on gifted children was published after her death, by her husband in 1942. It was a longitudinal study of twelve children with IQs higher than 180. It began in 1916 after inspiration from her work with the Binet tests. She witnessed a child score 187, which prompted her to seek out eleven other children with similar capabilities. The twenty three years following that initial inspiration were spent finding the children and attempting an in-depth study. Fully aware that she would never live long enough to see all of the children into their adulthood, Hollingworth meticulously attempted to build a framework upon which future research findings could be accomplished. She noted that individuals "who test above 180 IQ (S-B)," (i.e., Stanford-Binet) "are characterized by a strong desire for personal privacy. They seldom volunteer information about themselves. They do not like to have attention being called to their families and homes." Hollingworth was able to work past all of these concerns and conducted research that benefited science while maintaining participant privacy at the same time. She laid the foundations for future studies of gifted children with this work. The results of the study suggested that many exceptionally gifted children suffer adjustment problems due to two factors: inept treatment by adults and lack of intellectual challenge. Adults would often ignore such children because they were thought to be self-sufficient. Myths that exceptional children were clumsy, fragile and eccentric were dismissed by the findings as well.

Hollingworth had many accomplishments with working with gifted individuals. She was the first to write a comprehensive book on them, as well as teach a college course about gifted children. She was the first to study children with intelligence quotients (IQ) above 180 with her 1916 longitudinal study.

Hollingworth continued to research proper methods to educate gifted children and advocated for multiple criteria in identifying the gifted. She published over 30 studies on the gifted and pioneered research and development in naturalistic settings. She also developed child-center therapy and trained Carl Rogers.

Hollingworth's publications were systematically presented in The Psychology of Subnormal Children (1920) and in Special Talents and Defects (1923) (Poffenberger 1940). Forty-five out of the seventy-five articles published by Hollingworth were about the subject of the superior child (Poffenberger 1940). Even throughout her work with gifted children, Hollingworth was conscientious about considering her results in a social context. She concludes her 1925 article "Vocabulary as a Symptom of Intellect" by stating: "A summary of present knowledge, derived from experimentation, would therefore state that an individual's vocabulary is one of the most significant symptoms of his 'inherent power to learn how to accomplish or how to obtain what she wants.' This does not, of course, imply that from the quality of a person's vocabulary it is possible to predict his future success in life. 'Success in life' depends upon strong determinants besides intelligence" (Hollingworth 1925, pg. 158). It is noteworthy that she considered the implications of her findings in a perspective larger than a psychological article.

== Interest in the psychology of women ==
While studying at Colombia, Leta Stetter Hollingworth became interested in the misconceptions about women that seemed to be a part of the zeitgeist. Thorndike agreed to supervise her dissertation on functional periodicity, which focused on the idea that women are psychologically impaired during menstruation. Thorndike greatly influenced the work of Leta Hollingworth as he was a supporter of the variability hypothesis. The variability hypothesis postulated that, because men exhibit a greater variation in both psychological and physical traits than women, women were destined for mediocrity while men both occupied the highest and lowest ends of the range on any given trait (Shields 1982). Hollingworth set out to prove that the variability hypothesis was incorrect and that the extremes were not based on a male genetic superiority, instead extremes were culturally-based. She believed that rather than innate differences, societal roles accounted for the sex differences in the numbers of institutionalized males and females at the Clearing House for Mental Defectives. Although the research of Hollingworth conflicted with the direct interests of Thorndike, she completed her doctorate dissertation beneath his supervision. Her dissertation addressed the previously supported concept of women's mental incapacity during their monthly menstruations. For the study, she recorded the results of both women's and men's performances on a variety of cognitive, perceptual, and motor tasks daily for three months. No empirical evidence of a decreased performance with a phase of the menstrual cycle was found. Upon receiving her Ph.D. in 1916, Leta Stetter Hollingworth accepted Thorndike's offer of a position at the Columbia Teachers College.

In order to test the hypothesis that women were significantly impaired during their menstrual cycle, she tested twenty-three females and two males (as controls) by giving them tasks, which involved perceptual and motor skills and mental abilities over a three-month period. She concluded that her data did, "not reveal a periodic mental or motor inefficiency in normal women."

Hollingworth was also interested in challenging the widely accepted belief that intelligence is widely inherited and that women were intellectually inferior to men. She believed that women do not reach positions of prominence due to the social roles that are assigned to them, not because they are intellectually inferior to men.

An assertion held at the time was that there was greater variability among men while women were less variable. Hollingworth referred to this variability hypothesis as "armchair dogma" which she characterized as the "literature of opinion". This differs, she maintained, from the "literature of fact" which has been carefully obtained through controlled scientific data because it is merely statements made by scientific men not based on experimental evidence. Hollingworth states in her article, "Variability as Related to Sex Differences in Achievement: A Critique", "Undoubtedly one of the most difficult and fundamental problems that today confront thinking women is how to secure for themselves the chance to vary from the mode of their sex, and at the same time to procreate, in a social order that has been built up on the assumption that there are little or no variations in tastes, interests, and abilities within the female sex. It is a problem that has never confronted me." In order to further her research on the "inherently more variable male hypothesis", Hollingworth performed another experiment in which she used infants because they have not yet been influenced by the environmental conditions that could account for variability differences in adults. These environmental conditions would provide the adult male with many more opportunities to be more variable than females. Men had a wide range of professions from which to choose that would improve the talents they possessed. Women, on the other hand, had been confined to only one profession, housekeeping, which did not provide them the chance to prove their intelligence. Thus, their natural variability would be impaired. Hollingworth and Helen Montague collected data on 1,000 consecutively born males and 1,000 consecutively born females in the New York Infirmary for Women and Children. They took ten anatomical measurements on each infant and found that on the whole the male infants were slightly larger than the females, but there were no differences in variability between the sexes. "For the first time a serious crack had appeared in the armor of the variability hypothesis".

Hollingworth believed that she was mostly responsible for Thorndike's revised beliefs on the importance of nurture over nature. She also was responsible for Terman modifying his nativistic position concerning gender differences in intelligence testing. This was because Hollingworth showed that more men were classified as gifted due to social factors.

== Death and legacy ==
Leta Hollingworth died on November 27, 1939, at the age of 53 of abdominal cancer at the Columbia University Medical Center in Manhattan.

Hollingsworth's contributions to eugenics in American education were pivotal to the foundation and dissemination of gifted and talented programs.

She is known for her dedication to her research participants. She stressed the importance of direct contact with her participants, even when her peers in the testing profession did not. She famously said, "The adding machine has tremendous advantages over the child as an object of intimate association. It has no parents; it does not lose its pocket-handkerchief; it does not kick or yell. All this we grant. Those who really study children — those who would study any individuals— must be prepared to take pains". She is also known for her work in the first two decades of the twentieth century that contributed in a small way to changing the views toward women that led to women having the right to vote in a nation that had too long denied them that right.

Due to her pioneering role in the study of the psychology of gifted children, in 1978 the high-IQ society Intertel instituted an annual award named in her honor for excellence in research in education and psychology of the gifted. The Hollingworth Award was sponsored by Intertel and the Intertel Foundation for over twenty years. Additional co-sponsorship by the National Association for Gifted Children was obtained since the late 90s, to which the award had been turned over circa 2001, and which has continued awarding it yearly since.
