= Thomas Coughtrie =

Scottish businessman and engineer (1917–2008)

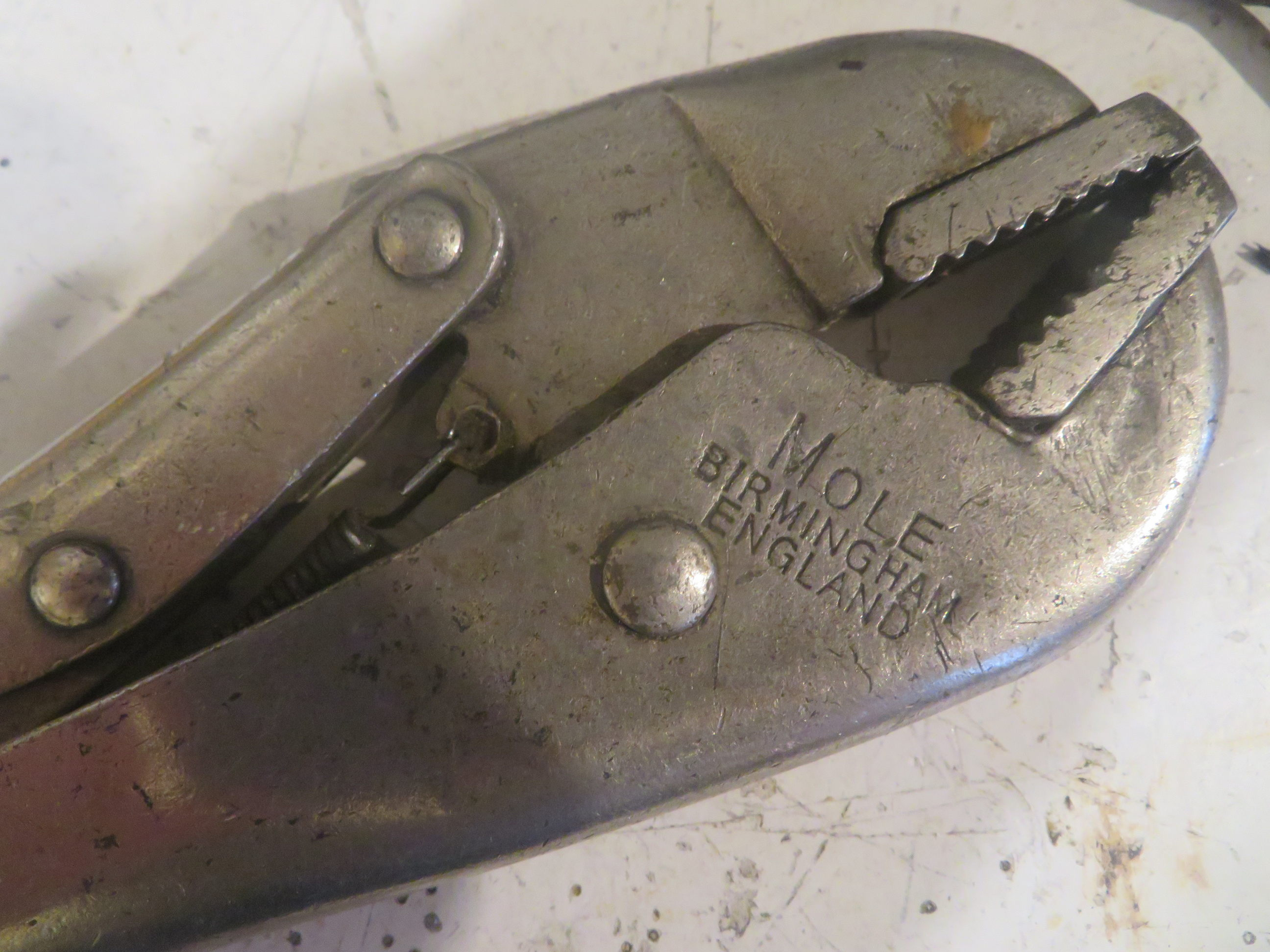
Mole branded Self-grip wrench locking pliers

Thomas Robb Coughtrie (25 November 1917 – 27 August 2008) was a chartered engineer from Motherwell, Lanarkshire, Scotland.

He was credited by The Times as the inventor of the self-grip Mole wrench, although this conflicts with the invention of the Vise-Grip locking pliers in Nebraska, United States, with an initial patent in 1921 and fuller developments patented in 1924.

== Biography ==
From the likeness between the two designs, the Mole Grip sketch drawings make it clear that M. K. Mole and Son produced their locking plier based on the existing American Vise-Grip patented in the U.S.A. in 1921 and 1924.

Coughtrie was born in Motherwell, Lanarkshire, Scotland. After his education at Bellshill Academy he qualified as a chartered engineer.

During the Second World War, he was an electrical engineer involved in the maintenance of 1,000 ton 'Whale' floating roadways for Mulberry harbours.

In 1947 he started working for the Birmingham engineering firm of M. K. Mole and Son, founded in 1835. When the second Mole brother died in 1950 he became managing director of the company.

In 1955 he patented the self-grip wrench. In 1960 the Mole company, and Coughtrie, relocated to Newport, Monmouthshire.

Coughtrie received an Honorary Doctorate from Heriot-Watt University in 1968.

He became a director of Cwmbrân New Town, governor of four local technical colleges and, in 1978, Deputy Lieutenant for Gwent.
