= De Witt, Nebraska =

Village in Saline County, Nebraska, United States

- Village
- Sign at the edge of De Witt

- Location of De Witt, Nebraska
- Coordinates: 40°23′43″N 96°55′20″W
- Country: United States
- State: Nebraska
- County: Saline

Area
  - Total: 0.42 sq mi (1.08 km^{2})
  - Land: 0.42 sq mi (1.08 km^{2})
  - Water: 0 sq mi (0.00 km^{2})
- Elevation: 1,293 ft (394 m)

Population (2020)
  - Total: 520
  - Estimate (2021): 507
  - Density: 1,200/sq mi (480/km^{2})
- Time zone: UTC-6 (Central (CST))
  - Summer (DST): UTC-5 (CDT)
- ZIP code: 68341
- Area code: 402
- FIPS code: 31-13015
- GNIS feature ID: 2398698
- Website: www.dewitt.ne.gov

De Witt (also spelled DeWitt) is a village in Saline County, Nebraska, United States. The population was 520 at the 2020 census.

== History ==
De Witt was established in 1872 when the railroad was extended to that point.

== Geography ==
According to the United States Census Bureau, the village has a total area of 0.42 square miles (1.09 km^{2}), all land.

== Demographics ==
Historical population
Census	Pop.	Note	%±
1880	305		—
1890	751		146.2%
1900	662		−11.9%
1910	675		2.0%
1920	623		−7.7%
1930	534		−14.3%
1940	490		−8.2%
1950	528		7.8%
1960	504		−4.5%
1970	651		29.2%
1980	642		−1.4%
1990	598		−6.9%
2000	572		−4.3%
2010	513		−10.3%
2020	530		3.3%
2021 (est.)	507	▼	−4.3%
U.S. Decennial Census

=== 2010 census ===
As of the census of 2010, there were 513 people, 222 households, and 154 families residing in the village. The population density was 1,221.4 inhabitants per square mile (471.6/km^{2}). There were 245 housing units at an average density of 583.3 per square mile (225.2/km^{2}). The racial makeup of the village was 96.3% White, 1.0% African American, 1.0% Native American, 1.0% from other races, and 0.8% from two or more races. Hispanic or Latino of any race were 2.9% of the population.

There were 222 households, of which 30.6% had children under the age of 18 living with them, 57.7% were married couples living together, 9.5% had a female householder with no husband present, 2.3% had a male householder with no wife present, and 30.6% were non-families. 25.7% of all households were made up of individuals, and 13.1% had someone living alone who was 65 years of age or older. The average household size was 2.31 and the average family size was 2.75.

The median age in the village was 43.6 years. 23.2% of residents were under the age of 18; 4% were between the ages of 18 and 24; 24.1% were from 25 to 44; 33.1% were from 45 to 64; and 15.4% were 65 years of age or older. The gender makeup of the village was 51.7% male and 48.3% female.

=== 2000 census ===
As of the census of 2000, there were 572 people, 243 households, and 164 families residing in the village. The population density was 1,370.3 inhabitants per square mile (529.1/km^{2}). There were 254 housing units at an average density of 608.5 per square mile (234.9/km^{2}). The racial makeup of the village was 98.60% White, 0.17% African American, 0.35% Asian, 0.17% from other races, and 0.70% from two or more races. Hispanic or Latino of any race were 1.05% of the population.

There were 243 households, out of which 31.7% had children under the age of 18 living with them, 55.6% were married couples living together, 10.3% had a female householder with no husband present, and 32.1% were non-families. 30.5% of all households were made up of individuals, and 18.9% had someone living alone who was 65 years of age or older. The average household size was 2.35 and the average family size was 2.87.

In the village, the population was spread out, with 24.7% under the age of 18, 8.2% from 18 to 24, 27.4% from 25 to 44, 24.1% from 45 to 64, and 15.6% who were 65 years of age or older. The median age was 40 years. For every 100 females, there were 100.7 males. For every 100 females age 18 and over, there were 94.1 males.

As of 2000 the median income for a household in the village was $38,056, and the median income for a family was $48,021. Males had a median income of $26,583 versus $22,778 for females. The per capita income for the village was $17,684. About 3.6% of families and 3.5% of the population were below the poverty line, including 3.6% of those under age 18 and 2.5% of those age 65 or over.

== Economy ==
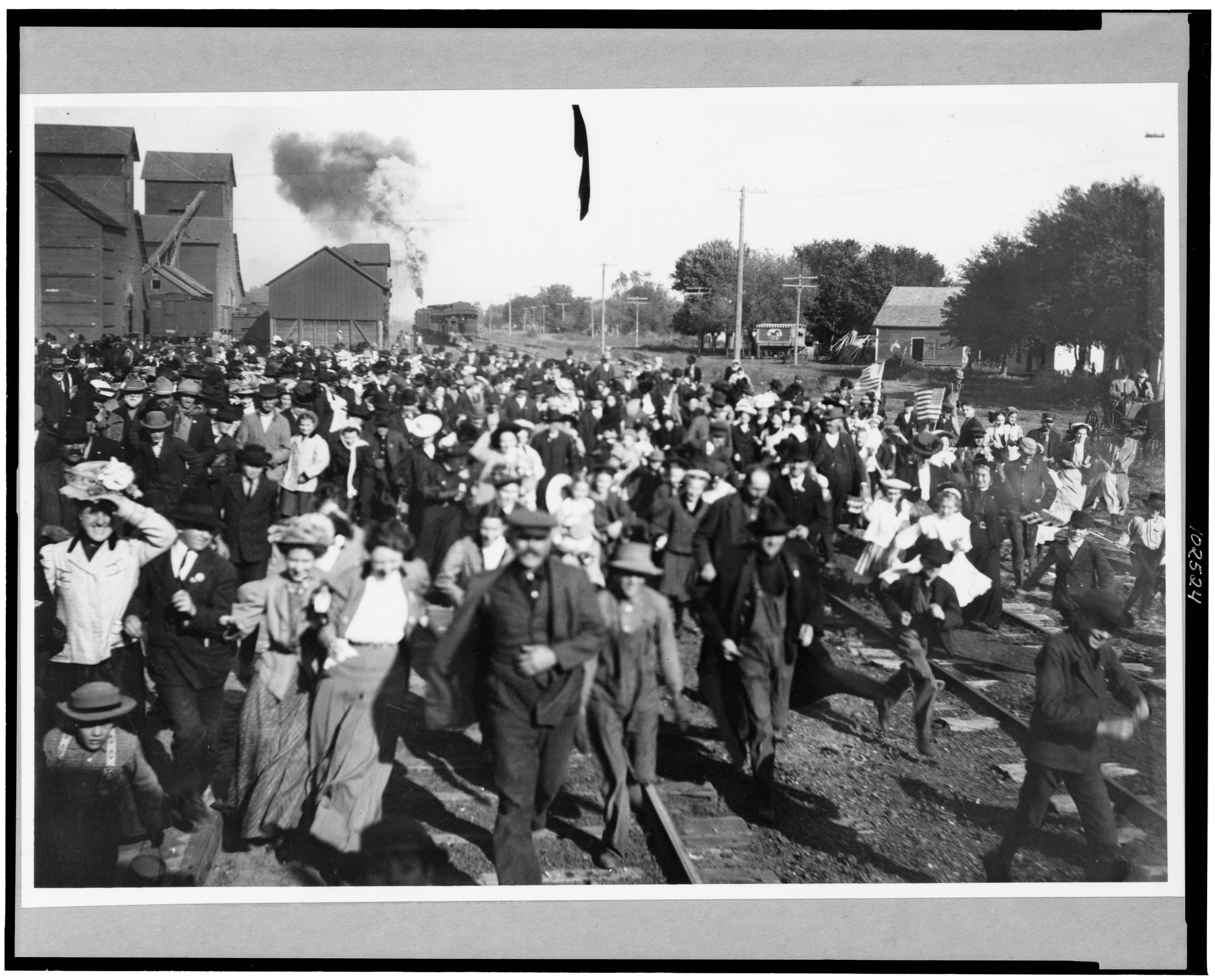
Crowd to greet William Howard Taft, 1908

A popular tool, called the Vise-Grip, was first manufactured in De Witt. The Vise-Grip was originally manufactured in De Witt by Petersen Manufacturing, founded by Danish immigrant William Petersen. Petersen, a blacksmith by trade, invented the first locking pliers and began selling them from the trunk of his car to farmers and people in surrounding towns. In 1985 American Tool Companies Inc. was formed by the Petersen family, and it in turn acquired Petersen Manufacturing. In 1993 American Tool acquired Irwin Industrial. The company operated under the Irwin Industrial name beginning in 2002 when it was purchased by Newell Rubbermaid. On October 31, 2008, the plant was closed and 330 jobs were lost when manufacturing of Vise-Grips and other tools moved to China. In 2018 the building was sold to Malco Products, and as of 2021 has resumed producing pliers of the same style under the name Eagle Grip.

In 2009 Gerry Durnell writing in Automobile Quarterly said: "The original Vise-Grip manufacturing plant now sits vacant. One auction has already taken place, another is contemplated, and the building is for sale.

== Education ==
DeWitt is served by Tri County Public Schools, which was established in 1966 as a consolidation of various school districts.

== See also ==
- List of municipalities in Nebraska
