= Cerva (surname) =

Cerva is a surname. Notable people with the surname include:

- Bernardino Cervi or Cerva, Italian painter
- Bernhard Caboga-Cerva (1785–1855), Austrian nobleman
- Elio Lampridio Cerva (1463–1520), Ragusan poet
- Giovan Battista della Cerva (1515–1580), Italian painter
- Giovanni Maria Cerva, Italian painter
- Serafino Cerva (1696–1759), Ragusan encyclopedian

== See also ==
- Cerva (disambiguation)
- Cervi (surname)
