= Crijević =

Crijević is a Croatian surname. Notable people with the surname include:

- Ilija Crijević (1463–1520), Croatian poet
- Serafin Crijević (1696–1759), Croatian author
- House of Crijević, Ragusan noble family
