= Croatian Latin literature =

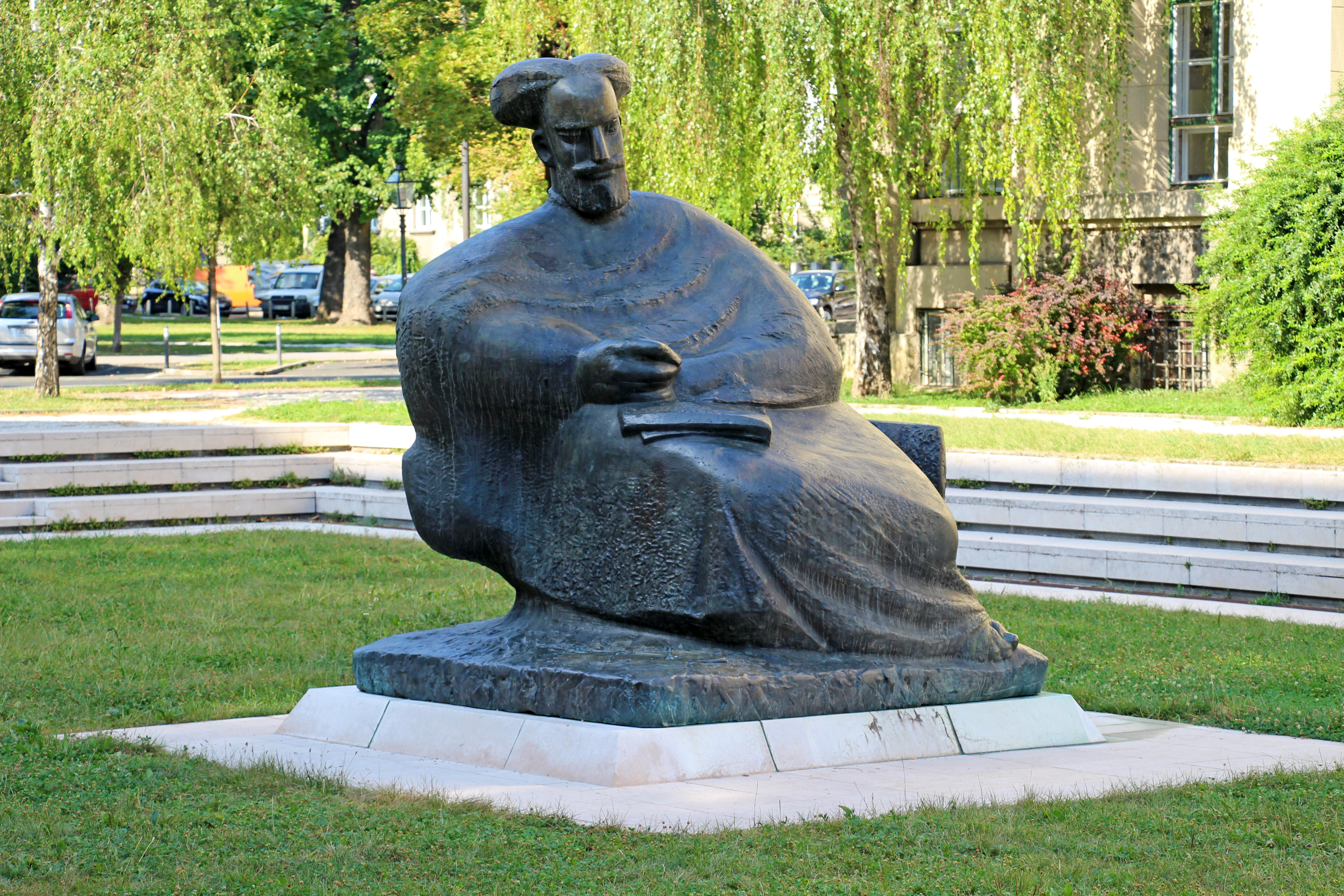
Marko Marulić, an important Croatian Latinist known as the "father of Croatian literature"

Croatian Latin literature (or Croatian Latinism) is a term referring to literary works, written in the Latin language, which have evolved in present-day Croatia since the 9th century AD. Since that time, both public and private documents have been written in a local variant of medieval Latin or in later times Neo-Latin. Some works have been found (written between the 12th and 14th centuries) which were written in a variant more closely resembling classical Latin.

== Medieval period ==
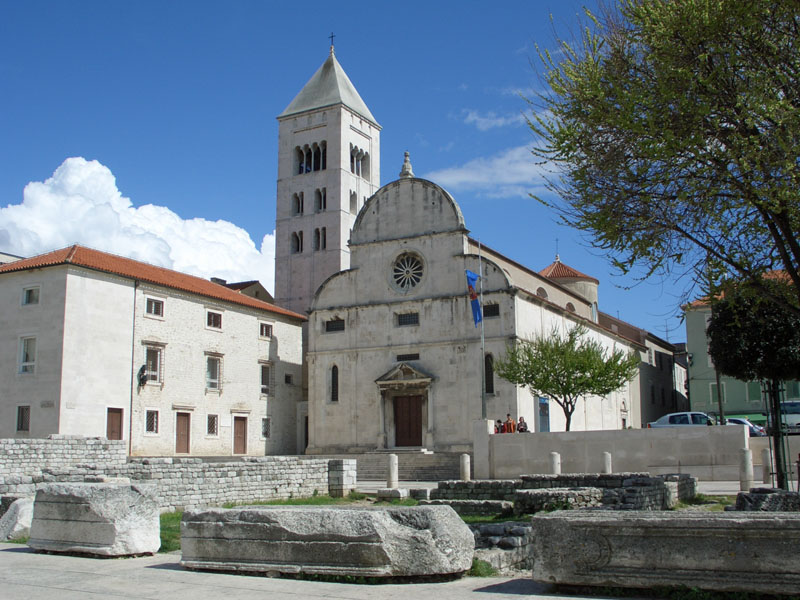
Convent of St. Benedict in Zadar

Croatian Latin literature has been found in modern-day Croatia since the 9th century, and is evident from numerous epigraphs cast in stone and even more numerous in public and private writings; some are in verse. The sarcophagus of Peter the Black (from Split) in the 11th century has an inscription pertaining to the transience of life written by the deacon Dabrus (Croatian: Dabro). A better-known example is the tombstone inscription of Vekenega, head of the Benedictine convent of St. Mary in Zadar (d. 1111). This inscription is written on four tablets with 20 verses (hexameters and elegiac couplets), in which an unknown poet credits Vekenega's work for the convent. An inscription exists for the knez of Bribir, (Mladen Šubić (d. 1348) in the Trogir Cathedral of St. Lawrence), consisting of 22 goliardic verses. There are also fragments of two inscriptions important in Croatian history: Knez Trpimir I (mid-9th century) and Queen Jelena of Zadar (976), starting with In hoc tumulo quiescit Helena famosa ("Jelena, the famous, rests in this grave") and ending with Icque aspiciens vir [anime] dic [miserere Deus] ("When you look here, say "God, have mercy on her soul"). The oldest document of a Croatian ruler is Trpimir's charter (852), the first record of a Croatian name in a Croatian document.

Traces of Latin in medieval Croatia date from the 9th century, in stone inscriptions and well-preserved public and private documents. Some of these inscriptions are in verse. On the sarcophagus of the Split nobleman Peter Black (11th century) are 10 verses about the transience of life, drawn up by the deacon Beaver (Dabrus). Notable is the tomb inscription of the abbess Vekenega, director of the Benedictine Convent of St. Mary in Zadar (died 1111), with 20 verses in which an unknown poet celebrates her and the monastery. An inscription on the sarcophagus of Prince Mladen Subic (died 1348) in the Trogir Cathedral consists of 22 verses. Fragments are preserved, the two above of which are noteworthy.

From the 11th century, two charters of King Peter Krešimir IV of Croatia survive: a grant commemorating the foundation of the monastery of St. Mary in Zadar (1066) and a grant in which St. Grisogono of Zadar bestows the island of Maun, off the Dalmatian coast (dalmatico in nostro mari). Other documents are notary records (the oldest from 1146 in Zadar): a statute from Split in 1240 and the Statute of Zagreb, composed by Zagreb Canon John Archdeacon Gorički (1334) and the oldest urbarium in Croatia. The Supetar kartular ("Proceedings of transcripts of documents relating to the Monastery of St. Peter in a village not far from Split" dates to 1064, and is a source for the history of Croatia until the end of the 11th century. Two liturgical dramas survive from the 11th century, both in rituals of Zagreb Cathedral. The more primitive ritual concerns a quest for the tomb (Sepulchre Visitatio); the second involves the Christmas story (Officium stellae), depicting the Biblical Magi and their visit to Herod.

The medieval Croatian chronicles were written in Latin. The earliest preserved chronicle is that of a priest in Duklja from the mid-12th century; in the introduction, the author states that the chronicle was written in "Slav" and translated into Latin Libellus Gothorum or Sclavorum regnum). The author of the Chronicles was from Bar and called "Pop Dukljanin" by Croatian historian Ivan Lučić, who had it published as a contribution to his own work (De regno et Dalmatiae Croatiae, 1666). Entitled Presbyter Diocleatis Regnum Sclavorum, the Latin text contains 47 chapters; however, the original "Slavic" version is lost. There is an old Croatian translation (probably from the 14th century), which was compiled by an unknown author in the vicinity of Split. This was translated during the 16th century by Dmin Papalićev (from Split), who discovered the manuscript in the Makarska Riviera and copied it. This translation (called the Croatian Chronicle) covers 23 chapters of the Latin original, describing the history of Croatia and adding five chapters on the reign of King Zvonimir and legends surrounding his death. The Papalićev transcript was then translated into Latin by Marko Marulić in 1510; this is the Latin translation which Lucius published in his aforementioned work. The Chronicle is divided into three parts: the genealogy of Slavic rulers, the legend of Vladimir the Great and the Dukljanska Chronicle from the 11th and 12th centuries. The historical value of the work is not great; the absence of a timeline, inventing and mixing of various historical figures and events and interpretations by later copyists significantly impede the work's historical basis.

During the 13th century Thomas Archidiaconus (ca. 1200–1268) of Split, a clergyman and politician from a Roman family, wrote Historia Saloni in 1266. It presented in chronological order the life and work of the Archbishop of Split-Solin since Roman times, representing a valuable historical source for the eras of Krešimir IV and Zvonimir. This contemporary history vividly describes the inrush of the Tatars, conflicts between Split and Trogir and political disputes in the city.

The Siege of Zadar and Obsidio Jadrensis are two books by unknown authors from the 14th century. They are a detailed overview of Zadar in 1345–1346, when it was threatened by the Venetians over land and sea. The author of Obsidio Jadrensis is sympathetic to the Venetian cause, unlike the author of the Siege of Zadar. A verse chronicle of the earliest history of Dubrovnik, the Milecijeva Chronicle (compiled by Miletius in the 13th or 14th century), is preserved in 91 hexameters.

== Renaissance humanism ==
Due to its proximity to Italy, humanism had already reached the eastern coast of the Adriatic Sea by the early 15th century. Beginning in the late 14th century, the philosophy began to appear in inscriptions by the local elite and traveling humanists in Croatia. At the end of the 15th century, Primorsky was under Venetian rule, while northern Croatia (under Hungarian rule since the 12th century) came under Habsburg rule (with parts of Hungary) in 1526–1527 (where it remained until 1918). Humanists from the coastal regions left in increasing numbers to study in Italy and other European countries and strengthen cultural ties with centers of European humanism. Humanists from northern Croatia primarily traveled to Budapest. Only Dubrovnik and its surroundings maintained relative independence until the Napoleonic era, and Croatian literature in Latin flourished until well into the 19th century.

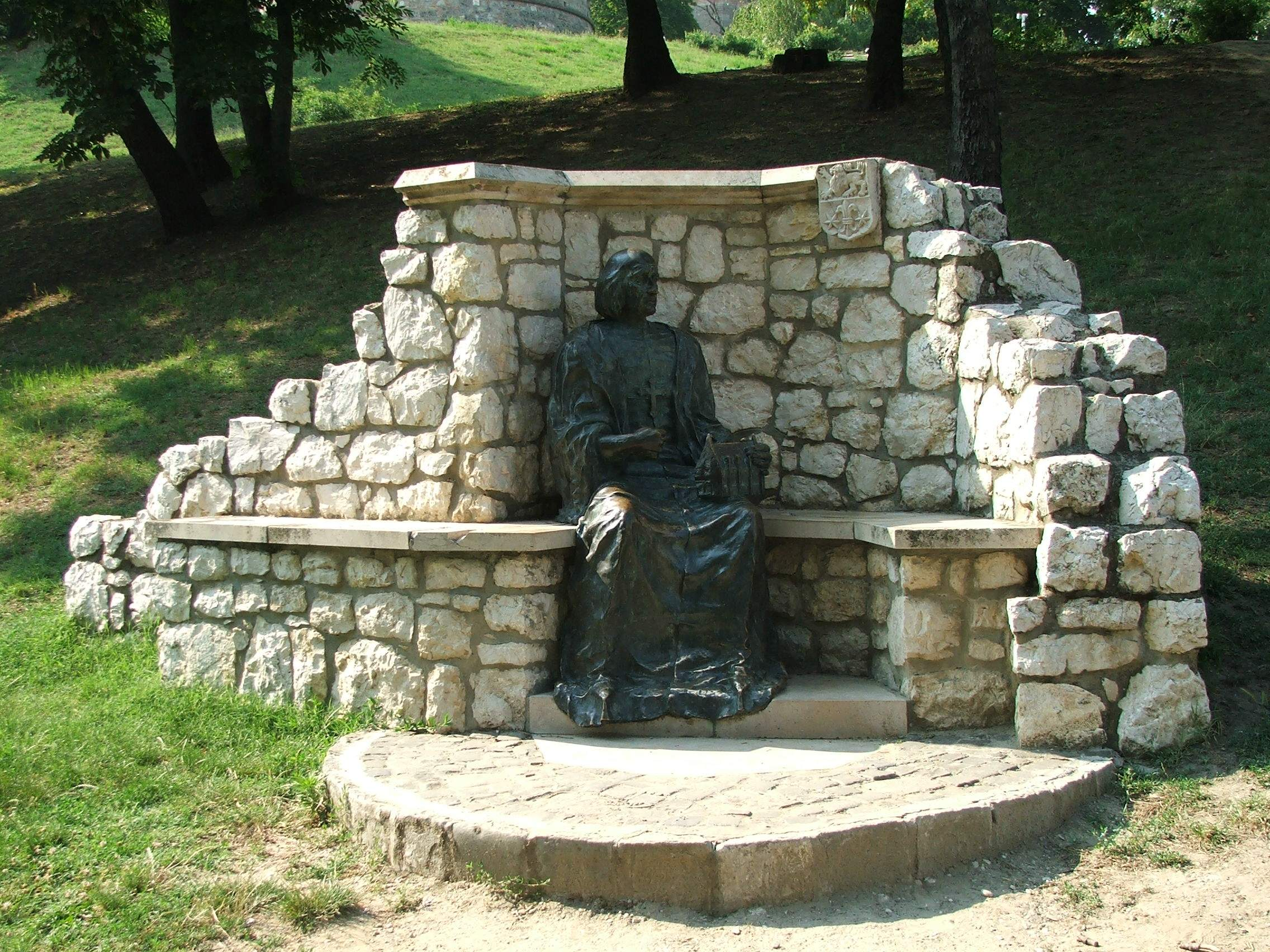
Statue of Ivan Vitez of Sredna in Esztergom, Hungary, sculpted by Zoltán Szentirmai

The central figures of the Croatian circle in Buda were Archbishop Ivan Vitez of Sredna (ca. 1408–1472) and his nephew Ivan (John) Česmički (1434–1472), both of whom were educated in Italy. Česmički was a Latin poet, who established a scriptorium in Buda and a library in Pozsony in 1467. This library was modeled on the University of Bologna, and was the first institute of higher learning in the territory of Slovakia and Hungary (the Academia Istropolitana). Česmički was considered the greatest Latin poet of his time outside Italy; Italians valued his education in Italy, he was prominent in Hungary as a feudal aristocrat and humanist, while the Croats cherished his Croatian origins. He influenced Hungarian, Croatian, Italian and primarily European Latin literature (he wrote exclusively in Latin). His Latin poems were the best Latin poetry of 15th century— particularly his epigrams, which are simple, clear and reminiscent of Martial's. They explored the themes of love, argument, literary discussion and the naivety (and greed) of pilgrims. His later epigrams are calmer, and often imbued with melancholy. Česmički also wrote an elegy which, although written in humanistic style, has many allusions to classical themes.

== Zadar ==
Bishop Juraj Divnića was a historian and Latin poet who influenced Zadar-area humanists.

== Šibenik ==
In Šibenik, the 15th-century Croatian humanist George Hafner published a book of poetry and three books of elegies, lyrical songs (Elegiarum et carminum libri tres) which were also the first Croatian incunable in 1477. This collection of elegiac poems explores the usual classical themes, but the poet also saepenumero Doloris cruciata affectus ("often suffered pain"), as he says in the introduction, where he reflects on his (and others') suffering. His own deeply felt pain can best be seen in the elegy on the death of two brothers (De duorum backfire Fratrum), one of whom fell Pro Patria pugnans, pro laribusque suis ("fighting for homeland and hearth"). In an elegy on fields laid waste in Šibenik (De agri Sibenicensis vastatione), Hafner expressed sadness and outrage because at Turkish incursions into his home country. The poet would have to fight Pro and, fides sacra, et patria dulcis, pro and / sit vita mea dedit barbaricis viris ("holy faith, for you, and sweet homeland, for you / I'd give my life against these barbaric people"). Three prose letters, sent to his friends, which were also included in the collection illustrate Hafner's classical leanings. The manuscript also featured a work about Illyria (De situ et civitate Illyriae Sibenici). Although he wrote exclusively in Latin Hafner praised the national language, especially its songs and proverbs.

The first humanistic educator in Šibenik was Antun Vrančić (also known as Antonius Verantius, or Wrantius, or Vrantius, 1504–1573), uncle of the historian Faust (Faustus Verantius, 1551–1617, also from Šibenik). On his journeys, Vrančić collected Roman inscriptions in the Balkans. During a diplomatic mission in the Ottoman Empire with Flemish humanist A. B. Busbecqom in Ankara, he found autobiographical writing by Augustus (Res gestae divi Augusti); this was later known as the Monument Ankara (Monumentum Ancyranum). Since its publication, the inscription has become known as the Codex Verantianus. In addition to histories and travelogues, Vrančić published a collection of elegiac poems in 1542 which examine love, life's joys and social events.

== Trogir ==
Ćipiko Coriolanus (1425–1493) was a humanist in Trogir who wrote a biography titled Maritime: Three Books on the Works of Commander Peter Mocenigo (Petri Mocenici imperatoris gestorum libri tres) in 1477. Also from Trogir was Fran Trankvil Andreis (Andronicus Tranquillus Parthenius, 1490–1571), who studied at Dubrovnik, Padua and other Italian universities and in Vienna, Ingolstadt and Leipzig. His extensive scientific and literary works in Latin include discussions, dialogues, epistles and songs. Particularly interesting are an epistle depicting the situation in Hungary after the first Battle of Mohács (1526) and a letter of Pope Pius V, in which politicians sharply criticized the church. Parthenius also published a hexametric prayer-speech in 1518 at Augsburg, reminding Germans of the Turkish presence overshadowing Europe.

== Split ==
The central figure in the Split humanist circle was Marko Marulić (Marcus Marulus, 1450–1524), known in Europe for his Latin morality tales and didactic works: Making Merry: Lives and Examples of the Saints (De institutione bene vivendi per exempla sanctorum, 1506; also known by its fourth title in 1530: Making Merry and Blessed in Life—De institutione bene vivendi beateque) and Evangelistarium (1516). The first work was published in 15 editions and translated into Italian, French, German, Czech and Portuguese, while the second had nine editions and was translated into Italian. These were practical guidance on how believers could achieve a decent life with basic Christian virtues, written in the spirit of St. Bernard of Clairvaux (Bernardus Claravallensis, 1090–1153), a chief exponent of ascetic mysticism. Marulić also wrote in Croatian; although he was a Catholic, some of his teaching were considered reformist by church elders.

Marulić's contemporary Šimun Kožičić Benja from Zadar (Simon Begnius, ca. 1460–1536) wrote to Pope Leo X about the devastation in Croatia (De Croatiae desolatione, 1516); this letter is reminiscent of Marulić's anti-Turkish letter to Pope Adrian VI (Epistola ad Adrianum Pontifice maximum VI, 1522). These letters were only a few in a series addressing concerns in Western Europe about the preservation of antemuralia Christiana ("the first Christian works").

Marulić's chief Latin work was Davidijada (Davidias, written between 1506 and 1516). This is a heroic-historical epic with distinctly Christian tendencies in 14 books and 6,765 hexametric verses. The theme is from the Old Testament, combined with Mediterranean humanism. The poem was written in a Virgilesque style in classical Latin, with additions of biblical and medieval Latin.

Another Croatian humanist was Vinko Pribojević (Vincentius Priboevius, 15th-16th century), who focused on the origins of the Slavs. De origine successibusque Slavorum (1532) is the first work in Croatian literature promoting the idea of Pan-Slavism.

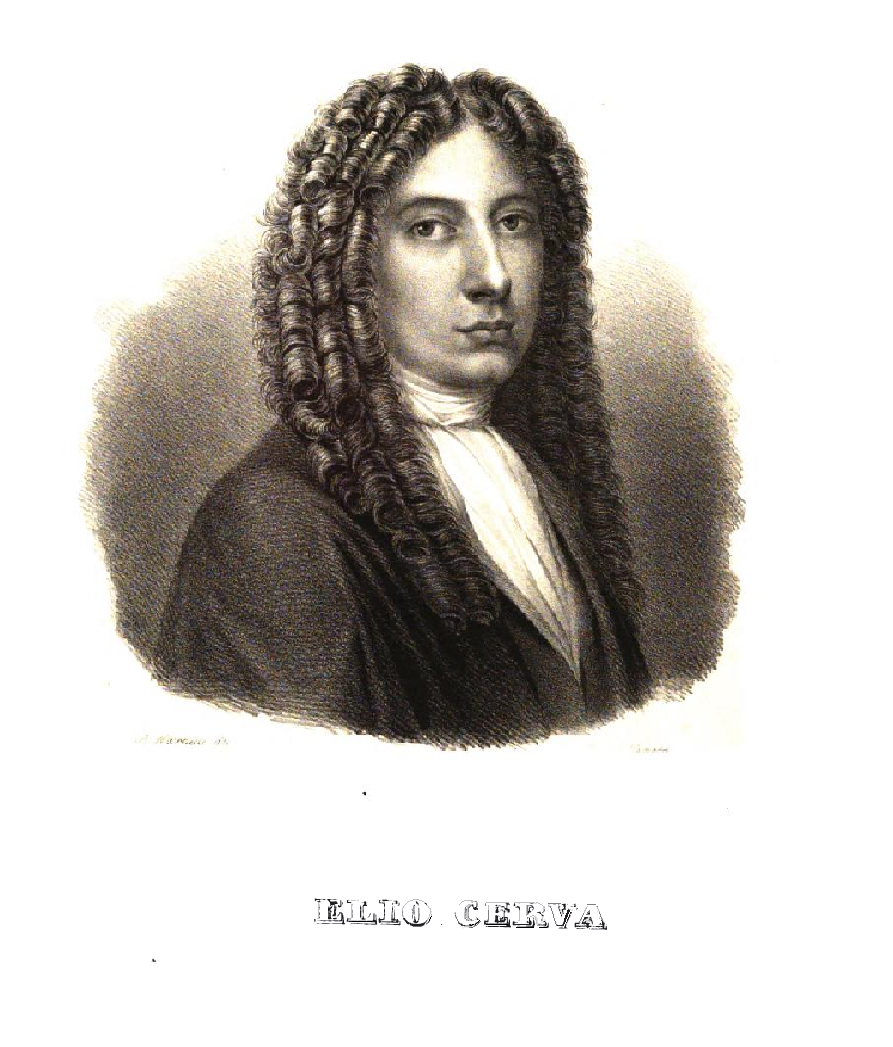
Portrait of Ilija Crijević

== Dubrovnik ==
In Dubrovnik the oldest Latin poet was Ilija Crijević (Elias Crijević, Aelius Lampridius Cervinus, 1463–1520), who wrote elegies, epistles, and an unfinished poem about Epidaurum (De Epidauro). His best-known work was a cycle of love poetry dedicated to the Flavian Dynasty. While these poems demonstrated Crijević's classical influences, they also emphasized sensibility. He had a talent for describing natural beauty, and his poetry features descriptions of Lopud, Dubrovnik and Rijeka.

Crijević's fellow citizen and contemporary was Jakov Bunić (James Bunić, Giacomo Bona, Iacobus Bonus, 1469–1534), who composed religious poetry. His short poem The Kidnapping of Cerberus (De Rapti Cerbere, ca. 1490–1494), written in his youth, is the oldest poem in Croatian literature. Another Christian poem, Christ's Life and Works (De Vita et gestis Christi, 1526), was a paraphrase of the Gospels and the first poem in Neo-Latin literature on the life of Christ. This work, published nine years after Martin Luther's 95 Theses, embodied the spirit of the Reformation. A younger contemporary of Bunić was Damian Beneša (or Benešić, 1477–1539), author of the epic poem De Morte Christi ("Christ's Death"), which remained in manuscript form until its publication in 2006.

Secular literature also flourished in Dubrovnik. Historian Louis Crijević Tuberon (Ludovicus Cerva Tuber, 1459–1527) emulated Sallustius and Tacitus in his picturesque descriptions of events, personalities, social and economic conditions over wide areas of Buda and Constantinople from 1490 to 1522. Due to Tuberon's harsh criticism of church policy, in 1734 his work was placed on the Index Librorum Prohibitorum.

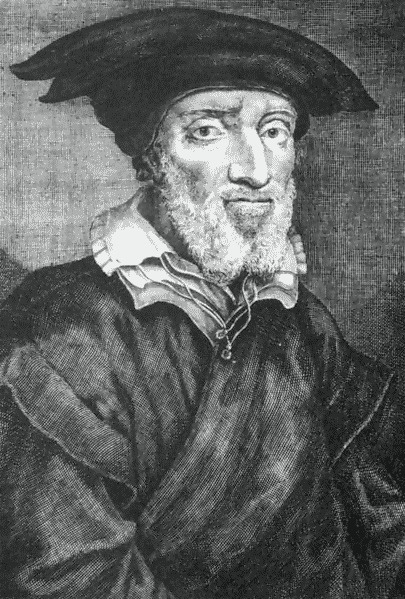
Matija Vlačić / Matthias Flacius

Philosopher Juraj Dragišić (Georgius Benignus de Salviatis, 1450–1520) hailed from Srebrenica in Bosnia; after initial training in Dubrovnik, he studied in Italy, Paris and at Oxford. In Florence, he became a member of the Platonic Academy and was noted as an expert in Greek, Latin and Hebrew. After 30 years stay in Italy he returned to his native Dubrovnik, soon returning to Italy. His philosophical works were written in Renaissance dialogue and sought religious reconciliation.

== Istria and Kvarner ==
Matthias Flacius (Matthias Flacius Illyricus (Croatian: Matija Vlačić Ilirik, 1520–1575) hailed from Labin in Istria, a humanist center home (along with Koper and Piran to many Croatian Protestants. Flacius spent his life in Germany, an associate of Martin Luther and Philipp Melanchthon. After Luther's death (when many Protestant leaders advocated compromise with Rome) Flacius founded a radical school of thought, named "Flacianism" after him. Due to his uncompromising attitude, for the rest of his life he was persecuted by the Catholic Church. His theological, philosophical, historical and philological work is vast: he left more than 300 books and papers. His major works are the Witness of Truth Catalogue (Catalogue testium veritatis, 1556.), which presented 650 witnesses, A Renegade from the Roman Church and The Key to the Scriptures (Clavis Scripturae Sacrae, 1567), an encyclopedic Hebrew dictionary which became fundamental to the Protestant interpretation of the Bible.

Franciscus Patricius (Croatian: Frane Petrić or Franjo Petriš, 1529–1597), from Cres, studied mostly in Padua; although the city was a center of Aristotelianism, he was inclined toward Platonism. After traveling around the Mediterranean, Patricius returned to Rome and became a professor of philosophy.

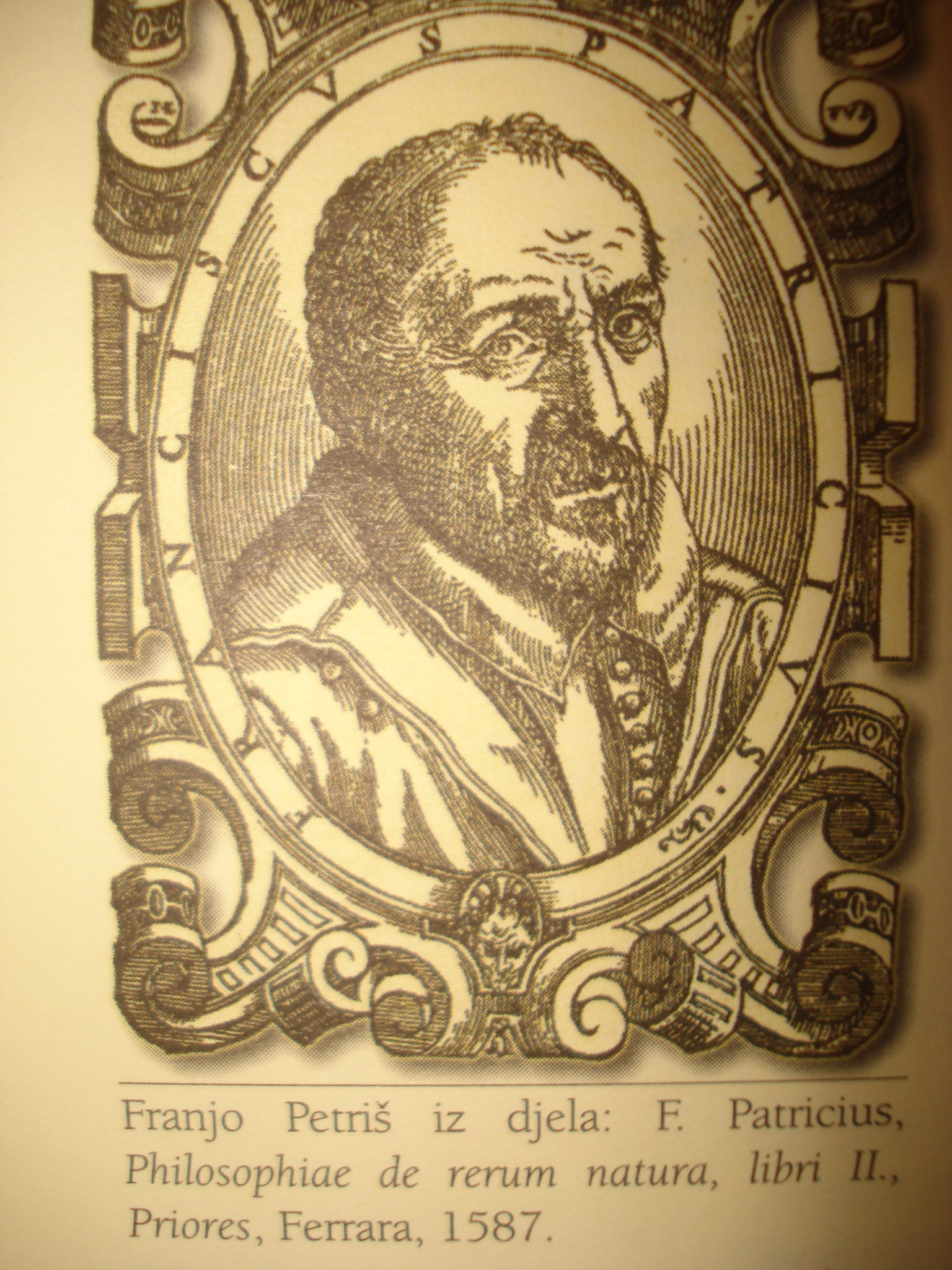
Portrait of Franjo Petriš from 1587

He wrote in Italian about poetry, rhetoric, philosophy, history, mathematics, geometry and medicine, but is best known as an anti-peripatetic philosopher. His work in Latin, Peripatetic Discussions (Discussiones peripateticae, 1581) emphasizes a pre-Socratic philosophy of nature and seeks to minimize the importance of Aristotle. In his New Philosophy of the General (Nova de Universis philosophia, 1591) Patricius exposes his metaphysical conception of the world, based on several sources: Plato, the Stoics and Hermes Trismegistus. Since the biblical account of Genesis was substantially different from the teachings of scholastic Aristotelianism, the work (despite the efforts of scholars to defend it, or enlighten quaedam loca obscuriora—"a dull place") was banned in 1594.

== 17th to 20th centuries ==
The transition between the humanist and classicist period began during the 17th century, with humanists becoming scientists. For about a century, epochal works appeared in Latin from representatives of the sciences and philosophy: Galileo Galilei, Francis Bacon, René Descartes, Baruch Spinoza and Gottfried Leibniz. Among the Croatian Latinists of this period was Stephanus Gradius (1613–1683), a Dubrovnik diplomat at the Roman Curia who was curator and director of the Vatican Library. He wrote treatises on philosophy, theology, mathematics and physics, and speeches and songs. Among Gradius' best-known poems is "Prejasne Venetian Republic", which explored the troubles faced by his native city ("De laudibus Serenissimae Reipublicae Venetae et Patriae cladibus drought Carmen", 1675) in 315 hexameters, providing a striking description of the 1667 Dubrovnik earthquake.

Among 17th-century Latinists was Ivan Lučić 1604–1679), whose best-known work was The Kingdom of Dalmatia and Croatia (De regno Dalmatiae et Croatiae, 1666), which provides an overview of Croatian history from prehistoric times to the 15th century supported by source material and illustrated with six maps. Lucius is considered the founder of Croatian historiography, and was involved in a dispute about the authenticity of Trimalhionove Feast (Cena Trimalchionis) by the Roman satirist Petronius, which was found in Trogir. Another historian of this era was Paul Ritter Vitezović (1652–1713); although his best-known work, Revived (Croatia rediviva regnante Leopoldo Magno caesar, 1700) was only 32 pages long, portions of his other historiographical works (both prose and verse) remain in manuscript.

During the 18th century, Latin was less a part of European literature; what Latin literature was still written lacked its previous creativity and thematic cohesion. However, in the Republic of Dubrovnik Latin literature flourished until its abolition by Napoleon in 1808. Cultural creativity revived after the earthquake and fire of 1667. Dubrovnik had no deep cultural ties with the rest of Croatia, preferring to remain in contact with the rest of Europe by retaining Latin as a lingua franca.

The last four prominent Croatian Latinists (Ruđer Bošković, Raymond Rabbits, Brno Džamanjić and Mark Galjuf) primarily lived and worked abroad. Georgius Ferrich (1739–1820), on the contrary, spent his life in his hometown. His first literary work was a version of the Psalms; first in hexameter, and then in lyrical verse. Since folk literature was popular, in 1794 Ferrich assembled a collection of 113 fables in Latin verse entitled Fabulae ab Illyricis adagiis desumptae (Croatian: Anecdote Prorečja Slovinskijeh). This work, along with correspondence with Johannes Müller (curator of the imperial poetry library in Vienna) and Julius Bajamonti (mayor of Split) during the late 18th century, is still extant. In these letters and poetry, Ferrich includes observations about local folklore (especially folk songs). One of Müller's letters concerns translations of 37 folk songs, including "Hasanaginica". Ferrich compiled a collection of Latin translations of Slovenian poems (Slavica poematia Latine reddita), written in the spirit and style of folk poetry. Ferrich's interest in folk literature is a precursor of Romanticism. He also wrote many epigrams, and a verse on the Dubrovnik coast (Periegesis orae Rhacusanae, 1803) in 3379 hexameters, describing natural beauty, customs and historical events.

Raymond Rabbit (Raymundus Cunichius, 1719–1794) is known primarily as a translator from Greek and an epigrammatic poet. He spent his life in Italy (along with Džamanjić and Galjuf) and was a member of the Roman Arcadia literary academy, established in 1690. His translation of Homer's Iliad into Latin verse (Homer Ilias Latinis versibus Express, 1776), while flawed, is considered a valuable Homeric Latin translation. In addition to Homer, he translated the poet Theocritus and the Greek Anthology into Latin.

Rabbit's disciple and friend, Brno Džamanjić (Bernardus Zamagna, 1735–1820), published Ulysses in Latin verse (Homer Odyssee Latinis versibus Express) in 1777. Like Rabbit, he was influenced by Virgil. Džamonjić wrote epic poetry, commemorative and educational elegies, epigrams and hexametric letters (Epistolae). Two short poems—"Echo" ("Echo", 1764) and "Airships" ("Navis aëria", 1768)—established him as a Latin poet.

Mark Faustin Galjuf (Marcus Faustinus Gagliuffius, 1765–1834) said of himself, "Sort Ragusinus, vita Italus, ore Latinus" ("I'm from Dubrovnik, my life is in Italy and my language is Latin"). Often persecuted because of his political activities, he wandered through Europe celebrated as an improviser of Latin verses. Džono Rastic (Junius Restius, 1755–1814) was a satirist in Croatian Latinist poetry ("Carmina", 1816) who was influenced by Horace (he is known as the Croatian Horace), Virgil and Juvenal. He was a critic of the late Dubrovnik Republic, arguing that any evil came from outside Dubrovnik.

In northern Croatia, Matija Petar Katančić (Matthias Petrus Katanchich, 1750–1825) was the chief representative of Croatian literary classicism. He wrote poems in Latin, Croatian and Hungarian and was also known as a philologist, historian, archaeologist and numismatist. Katančić's seasonal Latin poems, influenced by Horace and published with his Croatian poems in the collection Autumn Fruits (Fructus Autumnales, 1791), demonstrated his mastery of classical verse. Two other works are attributed to him: a short note about Illyrian-language prosody ("Brevis in prosodiam Illyricae linguae animadversio", 1791) and a booklet about Illyrian poetry and the laws of aesthetics (De poes Illyrica Libellus ad aestheticae exactus Legesse, 1817). The former is the first attempt to develop principles for composing Croatian poetry in classical meter, and the latter discusses Croatian literature from the aesthetic point of view.

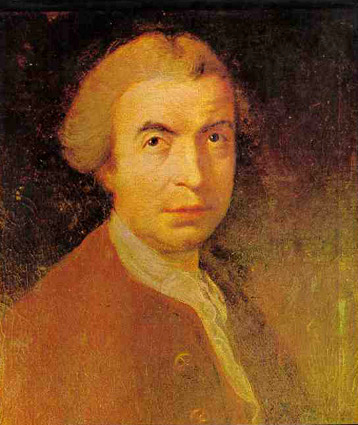
Ruđer Josip Bošković, polymath from Dubrovnik

Ruđer Bošković (Rogerius Josephus Boscovich, 1711–1787) was one of the most distinguished East European writers of the 18th century. Versatile, equally creative in theoretical and practical scientific disciplines, he worked in the cultural and scientific centers of Europe. His theory of a single law of nature is presented in his Theory of Natural Philosophy (Philosophiae Naturalis Theoria, 1758). His poem about the solar eclipse and the moon ("Luna De Solis ac defectibus", 1760) explores the causes of these phenomena.

Bošković's countryman, Benedict Stay (Stay Benedictus, 1714–1801), lived in Italy after 1746. His philosophical poem, Six Books of Philosophy Poems (Versibus traditae Philosophiae libri sex, 1744), was written in his native Dubrovnik. This poem, of more than 10,000 verses, attempts to reconcile Descartes's work in philosophy and physics with Christian teaching. Known by his contemporaries as the new Lucretius. Encouraged by this success, in Rome Stay began to expound Newtonian philosophy and scientific discoveries in verse. The finished poem, with more than 24,000 lines, was entitled Ten Books of Philosophy in Verse (Philosophiae recentioris versibus traditae libri decem, 1755–1792).

By the early 19th century, Latin literature began to disappear throughout Europe, and in the 20th century (in spite of individual efforts) it almost completely disappeared. A Croatian Latinist of this period was Ton Smerdel (1904–1970), a classical philologist who has published seven books of Latin verse by modern neo-Latin poets.

== See also ==
- Gaj's Latin alphabet

== Sources ==
- Cristina Neagu (2015). "East-Central Europe". In Knight, Sarah; Tilg, Stefan (eds.). The Oxford Handbook of Neo-Latin. New York: Oxford University Press. ISBN 9780190886998. OL 28648475M.
- LaCourse Munteanu, Dana; Martirosova Torlone, Zara; Dutsch, Dorota, eds. (2017). A Handbook to Classical Reception in Eastern and Central Europe. Wiley-Blackwell.
- Luggin, Johanna; Subaric, Lav; Spoljaric, Luka; Jovanović, Neven, eds. (2018). Neo-Latin Contexts in Croatia and Tyrol: Challenges, Prospects, Case Studies. Böhlau Verlag. ISBN 9783205202516.
