= Cervi =

Cervi is an Italian surname. Notable people with the surname include:

- Al Cervi (1917–2009), American basketball player
- Bernardino Cervi, Italian scholar
- Dominic Cervi (born 1986), American soccer player
- Federico Cervi (born 1961), Italian fencer
- Franco Cervi (born 1994), Argentine footballer
- Gino Cervi (1901–1974), Italian actor
- Valentina Cervi (born 1976), Italian film actress
- Cervi Brothers, Italian anti-fascists

== See also ==
- Cerva (surname)
