= Giovanni Francesco Soli Muratori =

Reverend Giovanni Francesco Soli Muratori
- Born: September 10, 1701; Vignola, Duchy of Modena and Reggio
- Died: 29 September 1769 (aged 68); Modena, Duchy of Modena and Reggio
- Resting place: Santa Maria della Pomposa, Modena
- Occupations: Catholic priest, historian, librarian
- Known for: Vita del proposto Lodovico Antonio Muratori
- Parent(s): Domenico Soli and Domenica Muratori

Academic work
- Discipline: History
- Sub-discipline: Medieval studies
- Institutions: Biblioteca Estense

Giovanni Francesco Soli Muratori (10 September 1701 – 29 September 1769) was an Italian scholar and librarian. He was the nephew and heir of Ludovico Antonio Muratori.

== Biography ==
Giovanni Francesco Soli Muratori was born in Vignola on 10 September 1701, to Domenico Soli and Domenica Muratori, the sister of the scholar Ludovico Antonio. At his baptism, his parents gave him the name Giovanni Francesco Nicolò.

Following in his uncle's footsteps, Giovanni Francesco decided to join the clergy. On 22 September 1724, Bishop Stefano Fogliani of Modena granted him permission to be ordained in the neighbouring diocese of Reggio Emilia, where he was consecrated the following day. On 11 December 1733, he became parish priest at Santa Maria della Pomposa, Modena. In January 1750, he succeeded his uncle, Ludovico, as librarian of the Biblioteca Estense.

On 3 February 1750, Giovanni Francesco and his brother Antonio Fortunato obtained a ducal decree authorising them to adopt their uncle's surname, demonstrating their extremely close relationship and a desire to perpetuate the family tradition. Determined to keep his uncle's work and name alive, Giovanni Francesco completed the translation of the Antiquitates Italicae Medii Aevi from Latin into Italian.

In 1756, he published his most famous work, Vita del proposto Lodovico Antonio Muratori (Venice: Pasquali), which was largely inspired by the autobiographical manuscript memoirs left by his uncle. A few years later, in 1763, he published the Lettera Apologetica, a commentary on Francesco Antonio Zaccaria's Annali Letterari.

Giovanni Francesco Soli Muratori maintained an extensive correspondence with scholars and writers of his time. Among his most prominent correspondents were individuals who had previously exchanged letters with his uncle: Enrico Enríquez, Giammaria Mazzucchelli, Francesco Scipione Maffei, Giuseppe Antonio Sassi, Lazzaro Spallanzani, Bernardo Tanucci and Apostolo Zeno.

Giovanni Francesco Soli Muratori died on 29 September 1769 and was buried in the Church of Santa Maria della Pomposa.

== Selected publications ==
- Giovanni Francesco Soli Muratori, ed. (1751). Dissertazioni sopra le antichità italiane già composte e pubblicate in latino del proposto Lodovico Antonio Muratori e da esso poscia compendiate e trasportate nell'italiana favella. Venice: Giambatista Pasquali.
- Vita del proposto Lodovico Antonio Muratori. Venice: Giambatista Pasquali. 1756.
- Lettera Apologetica, e critica scritta dal Proposto Gian-Francesco Soli Muratori al Reverendissimo P. Abate D. Angelo Calogierà, Modena, 1762
