= Cerva =

Cerva may refer to:

== People ==
- Cerva family, a noble family from Ragusa (modern Dubrovnik, Croatia)
- Cerva (surname), surname

== Places ==
- Cerva, Calabria, Italy
- Cerva e Limões, Portugal

== Other ==
- Adriana La Cerva, character in The Sopranos
- Cerva CE.43 Guépard
- CERVA, French aircraft manufacturer
