= Ludovico Antonio Muratori =

Italian religious, writer, historian and diplomat (1672–1750)

Reverend Ludovico Antonio Muratori
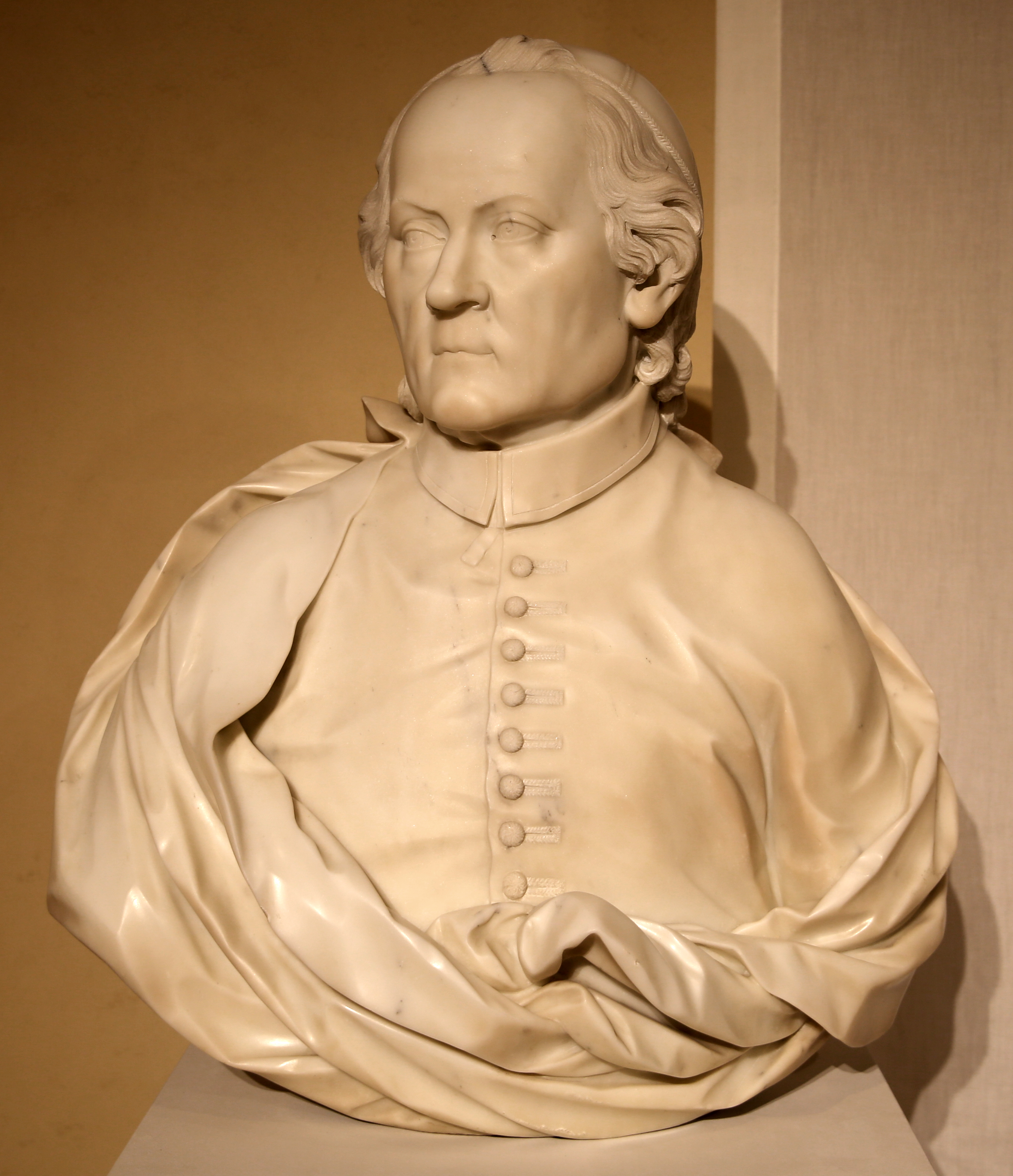
- Bust of Ludovico Antonio Muratori by Giovanni Antonio Cybei, 1774 (Modena, Biblioteca Estense)
- Born: October 21, 1672; Vignola, Duchy of Modena and Reggio
- Died: 23 January 1750 (aged 77); Modena, Duchy of Modena and Reggio
- Resting place: Santa Maria della Pomposa, Modena
- Occupations: Catholic priest, historian, librarian, philologist
- Known for: Discovery of the Muratorian fragment; Rerum italicarum scriptores
- Parent(s): Francesco Antonio Muratori and Giovanna Muratori (née Altimanni)

Academic background
- Education: University of Modena
- Doctoral advisor: Gerolamo Ponziani
- Influences: Benedetto Bacchini; Carlo Maria Maggi

Academic work
- Discipline: History
- Sub-discipline: Medieval studies
- Institutions: Biblioteca Ambrosiana; Biblioteca Estense

Signature
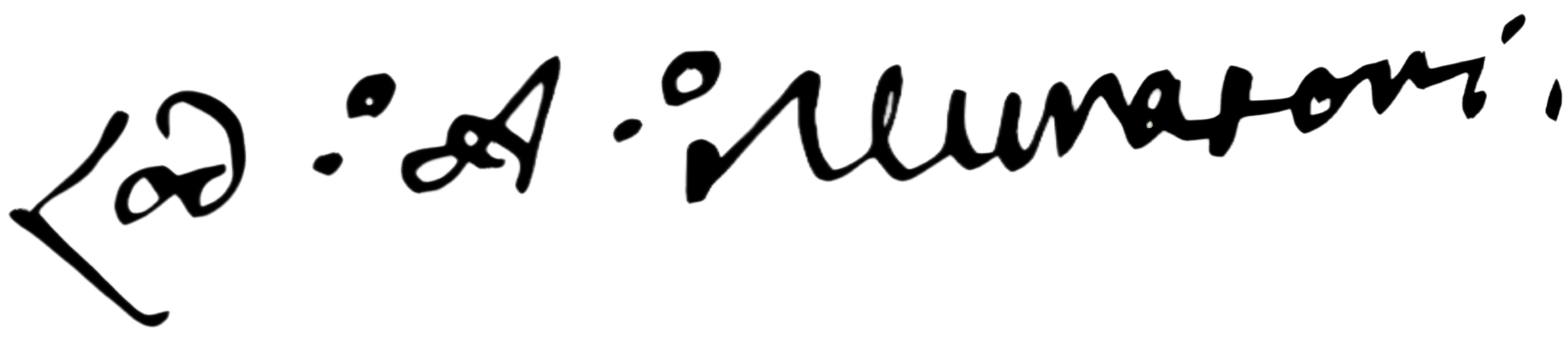

Lodovico Antonio Muratori (21 October 1672 – 23 January 1750), commonly referred to in Latin as Muratorius, was an Italian Catholic priest, notable as historian and a leading scholar of his age, and for his discovery of the Muratorian fragment, the earliest known list of New Testament books.

== Biography ==
Born to a poor family in Vignola, near Modena, he was first instructed by the Jesuits, studied law, philosophy, and theology at the University of Modena, and was ordained a priest in 1694. The following year, he was called to the college of "Dottori" at the Ambrosian Library in Milan, where he immediately started collecting unedited ancient writings of various kinds. His first publication was the Anecdota Latina ex Ambrosianæ Bibliothecæ codicibus (2 vols., Milan, 1697–98), followed by two other volumes (Padua, 1713).

Duke Rinaldo I (1700) appointed him archivist and librarian in Modena's Ducal library, which position he held until his death in that city. In 1716 Muratori became, in addition, provost of Santa Maria della Pomposa, and conducted this parish until 1733. He continued publishing unedited writings, first among which was a volume, Anecdota græca (Padua, 1709). At the same time he cultivated literature, as is shown by his works, Della perfetta poesia italiana (Modena, 1706) and Riflessioni sopra il buon gusto nelle scienze e nelle arti (Venice, 1708). He even intended to establish something like a general society of Italian literature, and as early as 1703 published for this purpose, under the pseudonym "Lamindo Pritanio", a plan Primi disegni della republica letteraria d'Italia.

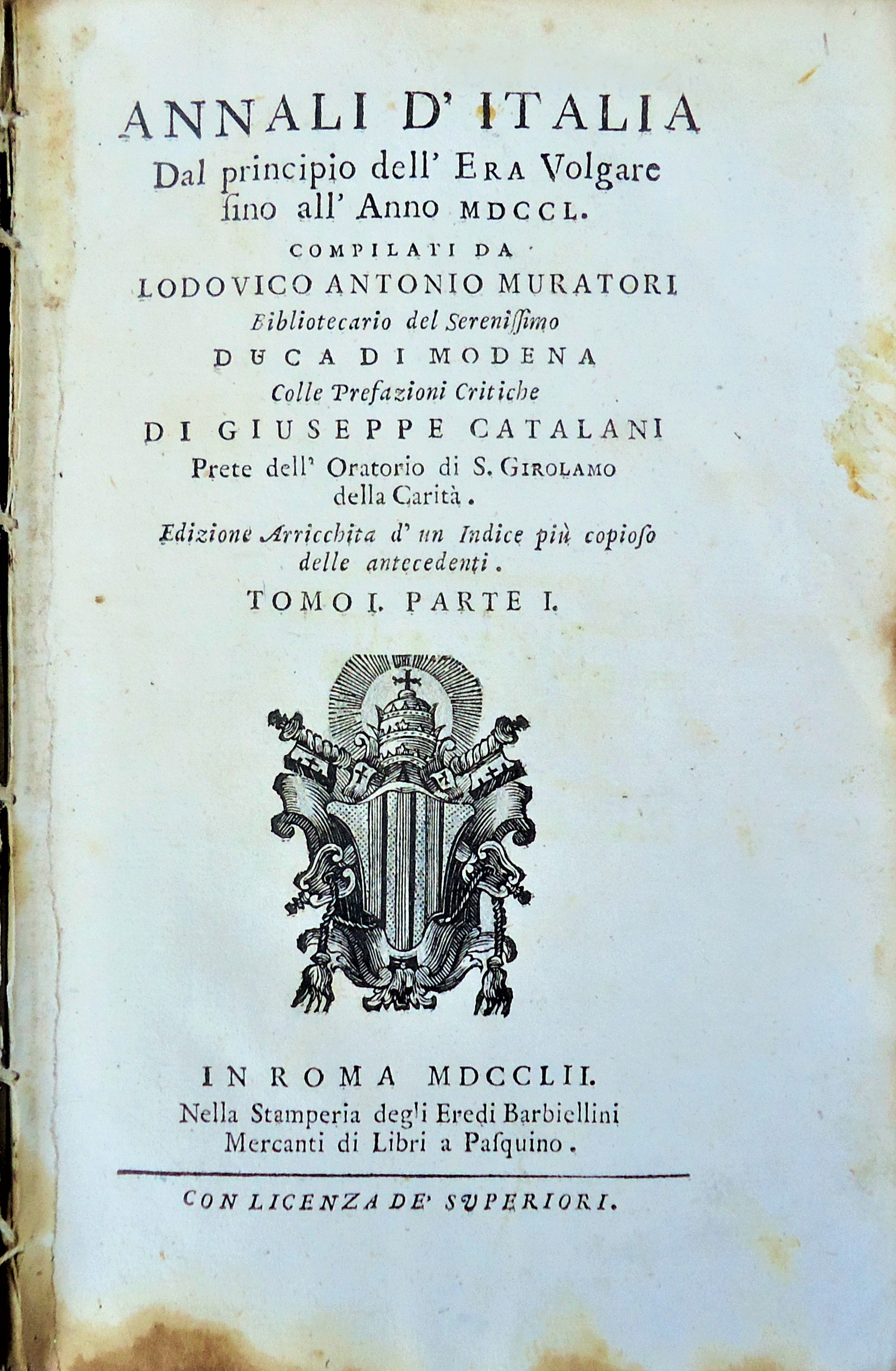
Lodovico Antonio Muratori, Annali d'Italia, Roma, 1752, t. I, p. I

In 1708 a quarrel broke out between the Holy See (aided by the emperor) and the Dukes of Este, over the possession of Comacchio, which involved the sovereignty of the district of Ferrara. Muratori supported the claims of his sovereign and of the house of Este against the pope by means of numerous historical researches, which he later on used in the preparation of a historical work, Antichità Estensi ed Italiane (2 vols., Modena: 1st vol., 1717; 2nd vol., 1740). He continued studying the sources for a history of Italy, and as a fruit of his untiring researches there appeared the large work, Rerum italicarum Scriptores ab anno æræ christianæ 500 ad annum 1500 (Writers on Italy, 500–1500). It was published in twenty-eight folio volumes with the assistance of the Società Palatina of Milan (Milan, 1723–51) and the combined efforts of Filippo Argelati and Count Carlo Archinto. An edition was published in the early 20th century in Città di Castello.

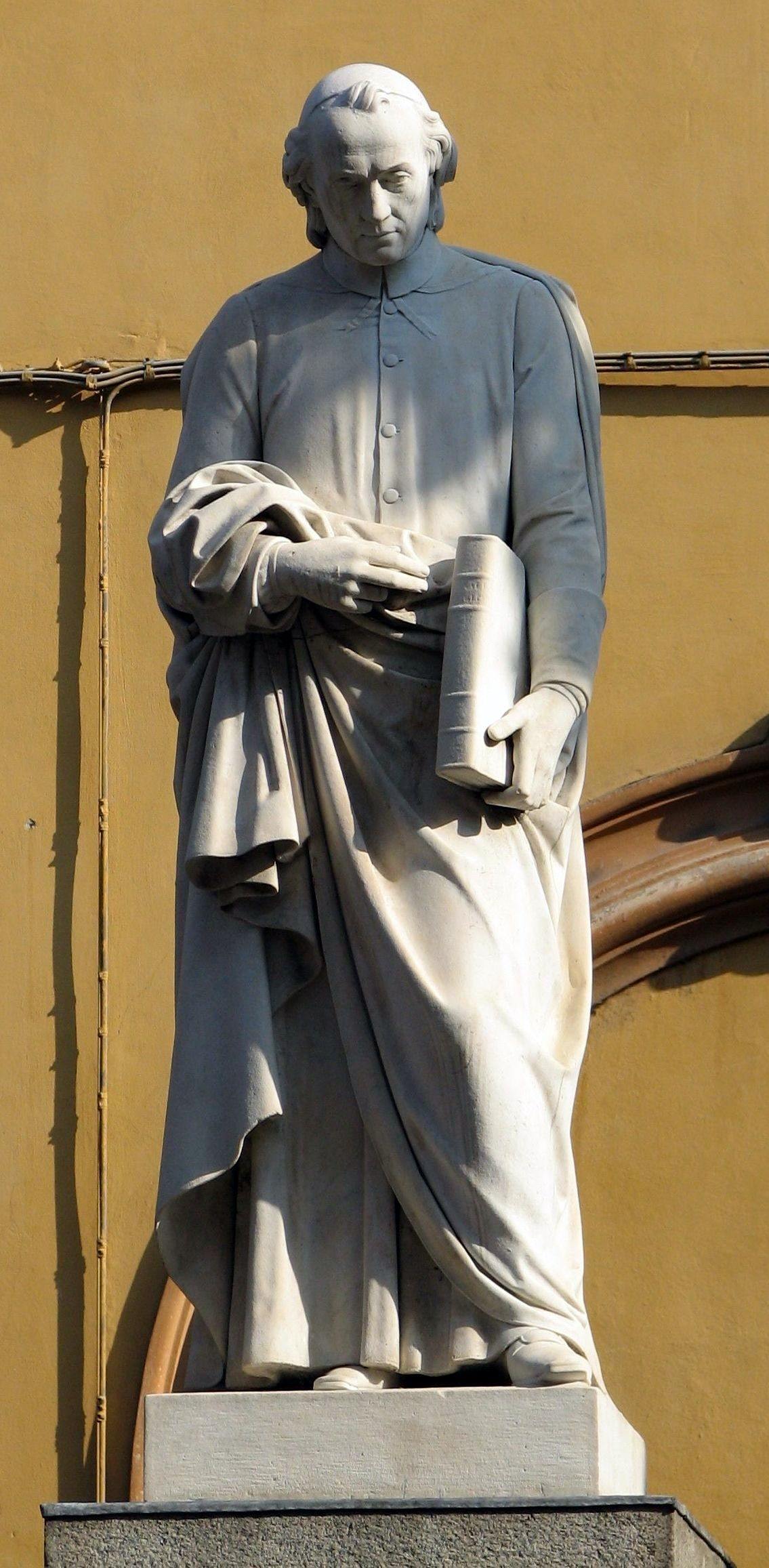
The statue of Muratori in Modena.

At the same time Muratori edited a collection of seventy-five essays on different historical themes, entitled Antiquitates italicæ medii ævi (6 vols. fols., Milan, 1738–42), as an elucidation and supplement to his work on the sources. In the third volume of this collection there is found the Muratorian Canon which is significant to the history of the New Testament canon. To render these researches accessible to greater masses of his countrymen, he himself published a new edition in Italian, Dissertazioni sopra le Antichità italiane (3 vols., Milan, 1751). Other publications of sources are his collections of ancient inscriptions (Novus thesaurus veterum inscriptionum, 4 vols., Milan, 1739–42), the fourth volume containing also the ancient Christian inscriptions; and the edition of the Roman Sacramentaries (Liturgia romana vetus, 2 vols., Venice, 1748), of value to this day. He wrote a chronological representation of Italian history (Annali d'Italia, 12 vols., quarto, Milan, 1744–49), based upon the numerous sources which he published or which otherwise were known. After his death this work was re-edited and continued (Milan, 1753–56 in 17 vols., new edition in 18 vols., 1818–21).

He also published a work, which attracted considerable attention, on the question as to how far freedom of thinking might go in religious matters, De ingeniorum moderatione in religionis negotio (Paris, 1714). Many of his views and opinions were openly challenged; for instance those concerning the Immaculate Conception of the Virgin Mary and the manner of worshipping the saints. Another work, which touches upon religious questions, Della regolata divozione de' Cristiani (Venice, 1747), also came under attack. He defended himself in his work, De superstitione vitanda (Milan, 1742). In the quarrel about the ideas of George Hermes, his book, De ingeniorum moderatione, was translated into German by Biunde and Braun (Coblenz, 1837) in the interest of the followers of the Hermesian doctrines. In his Della carità cristiana (Modena, 1723), he discusses Christian charity.

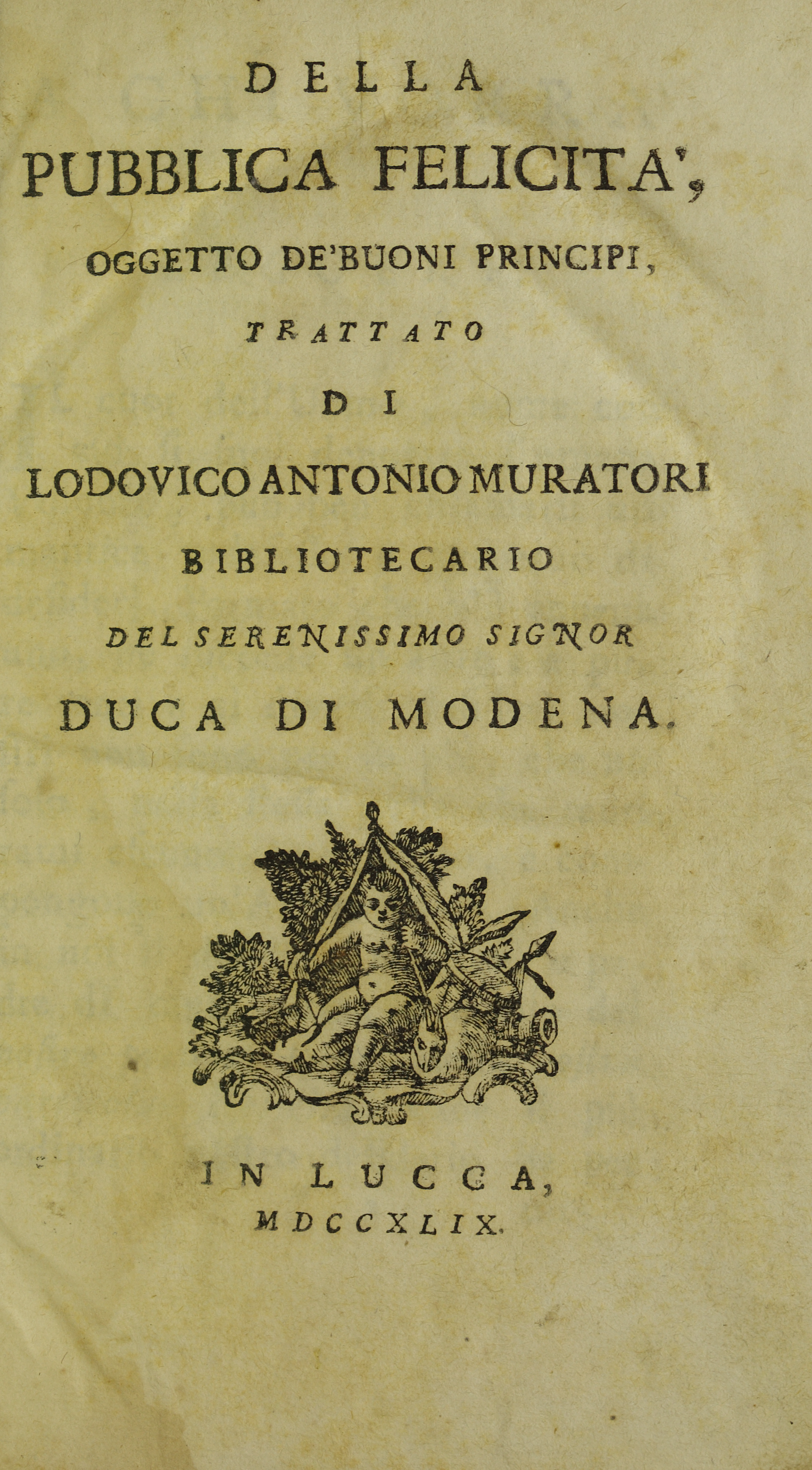
Della pubblica felicità, 1749

He still continued his literary studies, as is shown by his works on Petrarch (Vita e rime di F. Petrarca, Modena, 1711) and Lodovico Castelvetro (Vita ed opere di L. Castelvetro, Milan, 1727). On philosophy he wrote Filosofia morale esposta (Venice, 1735), Delle forze dell'intendimento umano (Venice, 1735), and Delle forze della fantasia (Venice, 1745). Law and politics are treated in Governo della Peste politico, medico ed ecclesiastico (Modena, 1714; frequently reprinted), Defetti della Giurisprudenza (1741), Della pubblica felicità (1749). He corresponded with a large circle of acquaintances, and a collection of his letters by Antonio Selmi appeared in Modena (1883); another by Ceruti in Modena (1885). In spite of many attacks which he suffered for his religious views, and notwithstanding many of his opinions regarding ecclesiastical politics were not approved of in Rome, he was highly esteemed in high circles of the Catholic Church, as is shown in letters sent to him by Benedict XIV and Cardinal Ganganelli, who later became Clement XIV.

Muratori was a member of the first learned society in lands ruled by the Austrian Habsburgs, the Societas eruditorum incognitorum in terris Austriacis and was publishing in the society's journal. In 1717, he was elected a Fellow of the Royal Society on the recommendation of Isaac Newton. Muratori died in Modena on 23 January 1750 and was buried in his church of Santa Maria della Pomposa. His nephew, Giovanni Francesco Soli Muratori (1701-1769) became his uncle Ludovico's successor and librarian of the Ducal collections.

== Legacy ==
Muratori was one of the fathers of modern historiography and a pioneer in the critical collection of sources. He exerted a wide influence on European historiography, serving as a methodological bridge between the erudition of the late Renaissance and the narrative histories of the Enlightenment. Edward Gibbon made extensive use of his work and famously referred to him as "my guide and master in the history of Italy". The structural framework and historiographical rigor of Muratori's Rerum Italicarum Scriptores served as the blueprint for other 19th-century source-editing projects, such as the Monumenta Germaniae Historica and the Rolls series.

== Sources ==
Ludovico Muratori

- Selmi, Antonio, ed. (1883). Lettere Inedite di Lodovico Antonio Muratori. Modena: Tip. Vicenzi.
- Soli Muratori, Gian Francesco (1756). Vita del proposto Lodovico Antonio Muratori. Venice: Pasquali.
- Miller Gamble, William Thomas (1924). "The Monumenta Germaniae Historica: Its Antecedents and Motives". The Catholic Historical Review. 10 (2): 202–233. JSTOR 25012071.
- Dupront, Alphonse (1976). L.A. Muratori et la société européenne des pré-Lumières. Essai d'inventaire et de typologie d'après l'Epistolario. Florence: Olschki. ISBN 978-8822222381.
- Hall, Marie Boas (1982). "The Royal Society and Italy 1667-1795". Notes and Records of the Royal Society of London. 37 (1): 63–81. JSTOR 531477.
- Hay, Denys (1988). "Muratori and British Historians". Renaissance Essays. London: Hambledon. pp. 85–102. ISBN 978-0907628965.
- Brendan Maurice Dooley, Italy in the Baroque: Selected readings, New York and London 1995, pp. 622–628 and p. 678.
- Moos, Pierre von (1996). "Muratori et les origines du médiévisme italien". Romania. 114 (453/454): 203–224. JSTOR 45039106.
- Vismara, Paola (2014). "Lodovico Antonio Muratori (1672–1750): Enlightenment in a Tridentine Mode". In Jeffrey D. Burson; Ulrich L. Lehner (eds.). Enlightenment and Catholicism in Europe: A Transnational History. South Bend, IN: University of Notre Dame Press. pp. 249–68. doi:10.2307/jj.21995463.14.
- Muratori, Ludovico (2024). On the Moderation of Reason in Religious Matters. Translated by Ulrich L. Lehner. Washington, DC: The Catholic University of America Press. ISBN 978-0-8132-3844-9.
