= Ludovicus Tubero =

Ragusan historian

- Born: 1459; Ragusa, Republic of Ragusa
- Died: 1527 (aged 67–68)
- Occupation: historian

Ludovicus Cerva Tubero (Serbo-Croatian: Ludovik Crijević Tuberon, Italian: Ludovico Cerva Tuberon, his surname is also written Cervarius; 1459–1527), was a Ragusan historian, known for his historiographic work on the Jagiellon period in Hungary.

== Life ==
He was born in Ragusa (modern Dubrovnik) into the House of Cerva. He studied philosophy, theology and mathematics in Paris. At the age of 25, he entered the Benedictine Order and became dedicated to investigating ancient Roman historical works and studying local history. For twenty years he worked at the monastery of St. Jacob at Višnjica near Dubrovnik.

A part of his work that presents a detailed description of the Ottoman Empire was first published in 1590 in Florence. It was titled "Commentary on the origin, customs and history of the Turks" (Latin: De Turcarum origine, moribus et rebus gestis commentarius).

Tuberon's chief work Writings on the Present Age (Commentaria temporum suorum) was first published in 1603 and was printed a few times. This historical work chronicles the history from the death of king Matthias Corvinus in 1490 until the death of Pope Leo X in 1522. The text offers a basic source of the Jagiellon period in the Kingdom of Hungary. In it Tuberon, drawing on Sallustius and Tacitus, accurately and descriptively showed the events, personalities, social and economic events on the wide area between Buda and Constantinople from 1490 to 1522.
