= Giovanni Maria Cerva =

Italian painter

- il Bagnolino
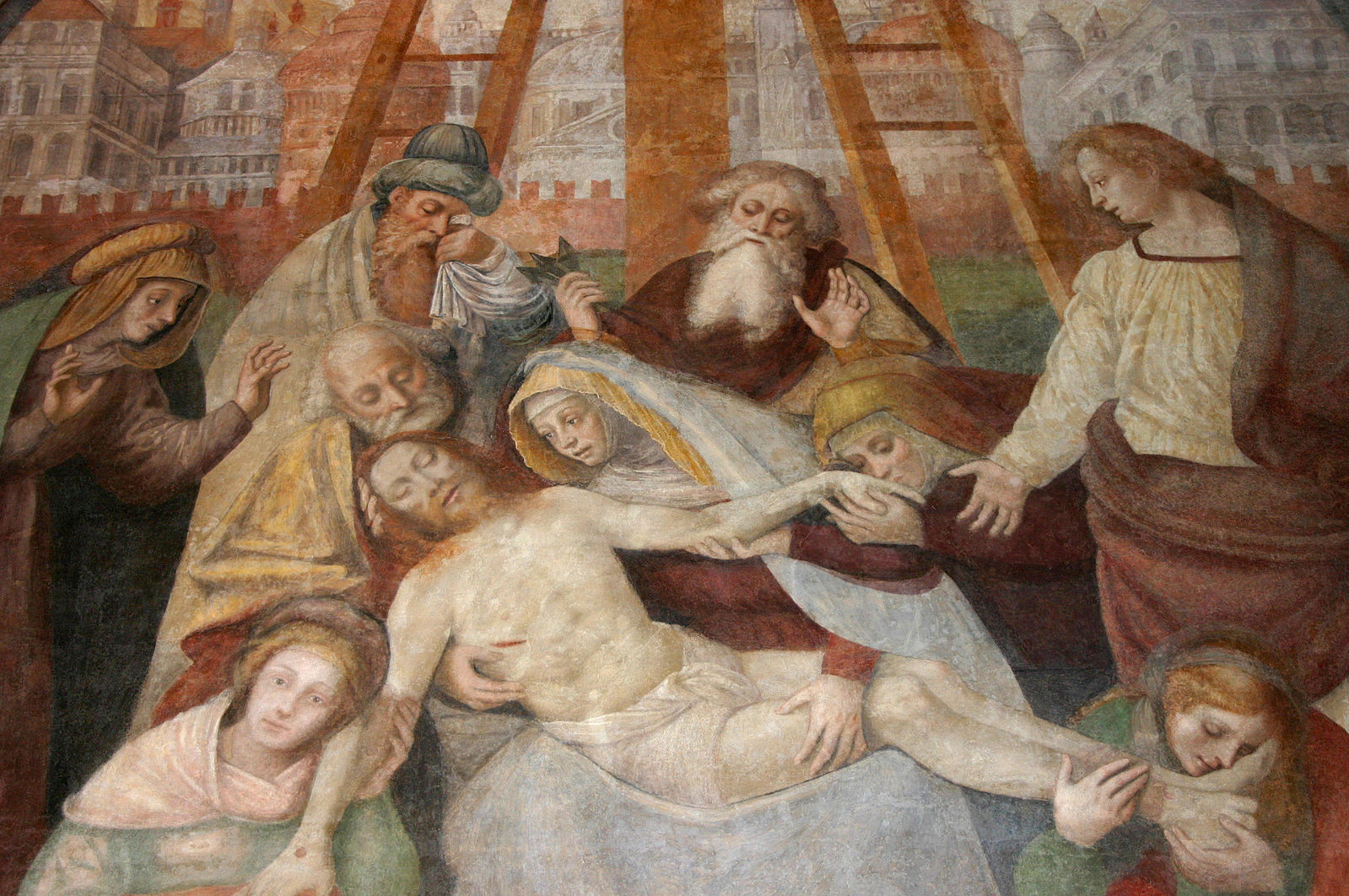
- Style: painter
- Movement: Baroque period

Giovanni Maria Cerva, also called il Bagnolino, was a 17th-century Italian painter of the Baroque period, active in quadratura in the city of Bologna. He was a pupil of Menichino. He was active in 1640.
