= Santa Maria della Pomposa, Modena =

Church in Modena, Italy

Coordinates: 44°38′57″N 10°55′27″E

Church of St. Mary of Pomposa; Chiesa di Santa Maria della Pomposa (Italian)
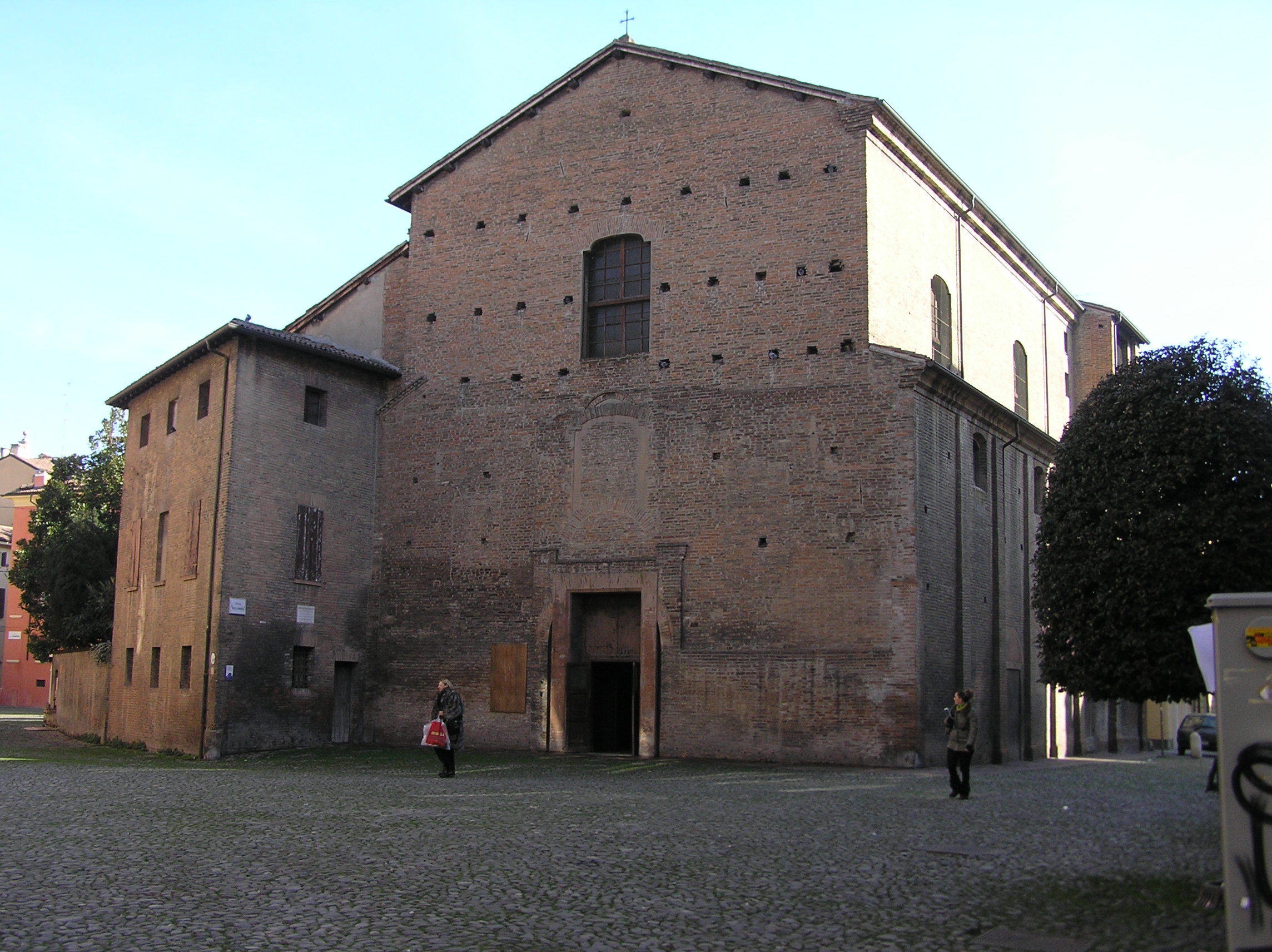
- Chiesa di Santa Maria della Pomposa

Religion
- Affiliation: Catholic

Location
- Interactive map of: Church of St. Mary of Pomposa; Chiesa di Santa Maria della Pomposa (Italian)

The church of Santa Maria della Pomposa in Modena, Italy, is an ancient church in the city, once located at the edge of the city walls. Its name derives from the Pomposa Abbey located near the delta of the Po River.

A religious building at the site was documented by 1153. In 1716, the Duke of Modena, Rinaldo I grants the building to his librarian Ludovico Antonio Muratori (1762 - 1750). Deconsecrated in 1774, along with the Aedes Muratoriana was granted by Duke Ercole III to the confraternity of St Sebastian. The church was reconsecrated in 1814. In 1922 Muratori was buried in the church, with a monument by Ludovico Pogliaghi. Among the works inside are a series of canvases depicting the Life of St Sebastian by Bernardino Cervi and an Enthroned Virgin with saints Sebastiano, Rocco, and Geminano by Giovanni Boulanger, copy of a Correggio painting now in Dresden. The adjacent museum celebrates the life and works of Ludovico Antonio Muratori.

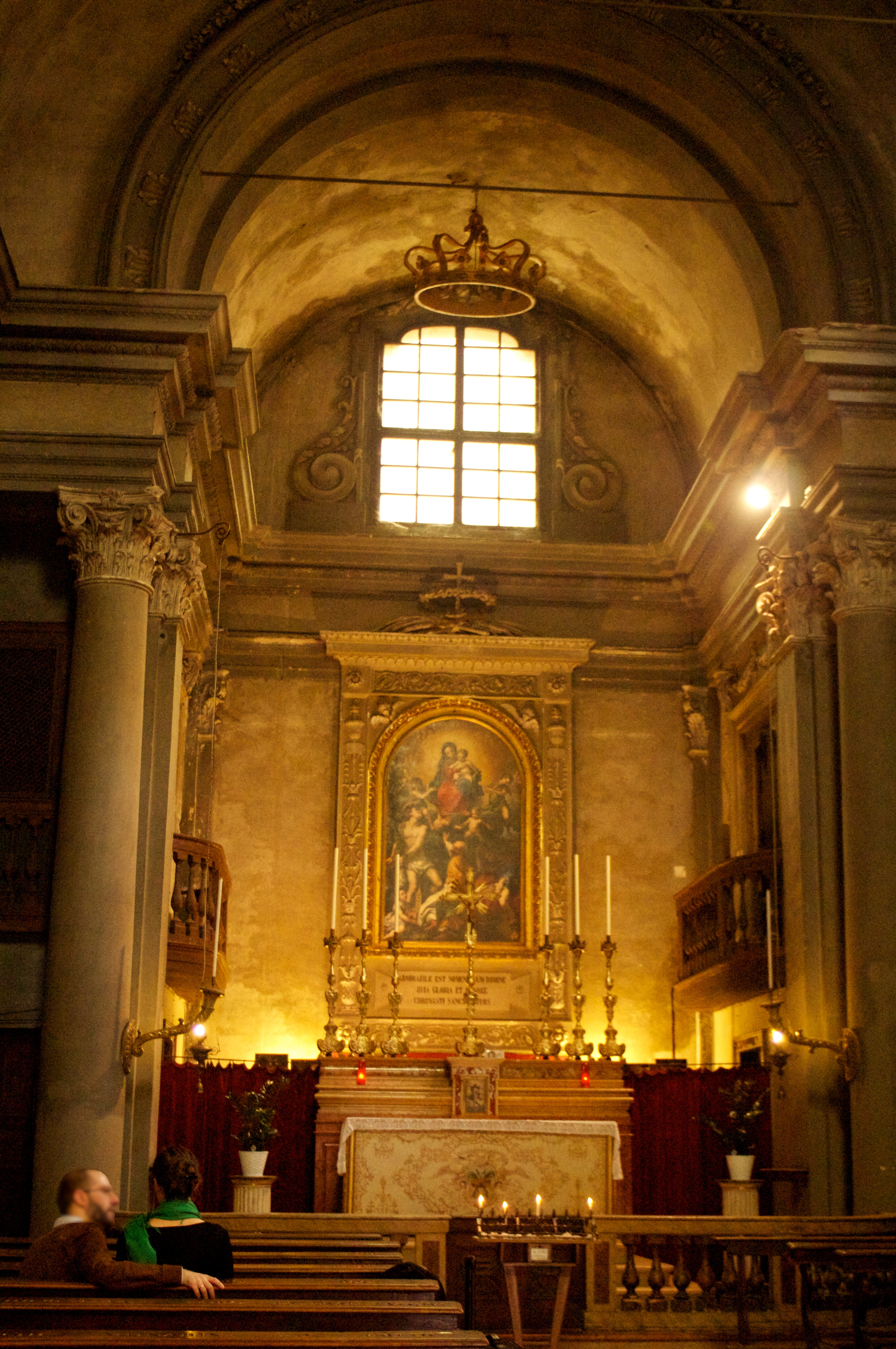
L'interno

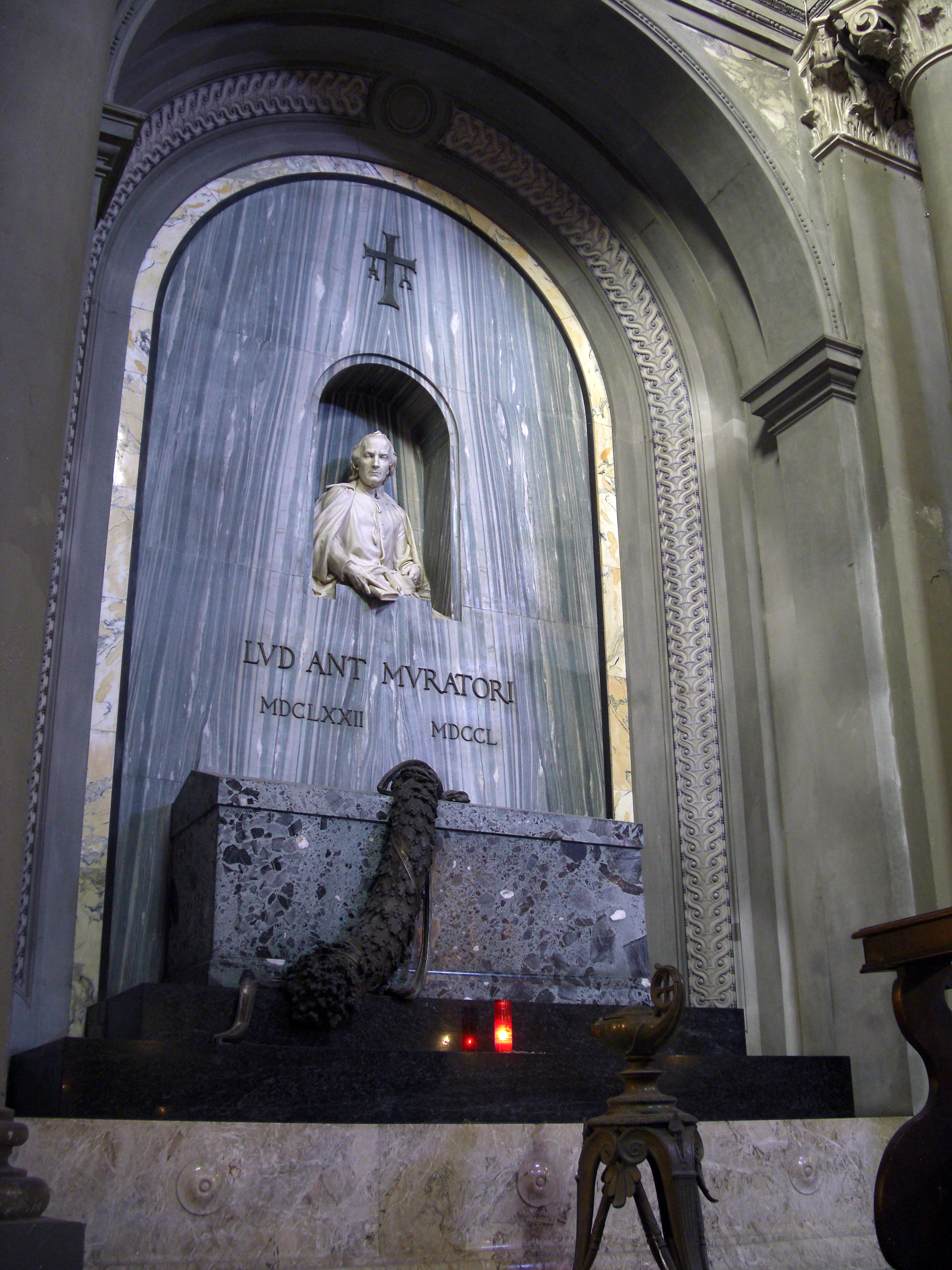
La tomba di Muratori

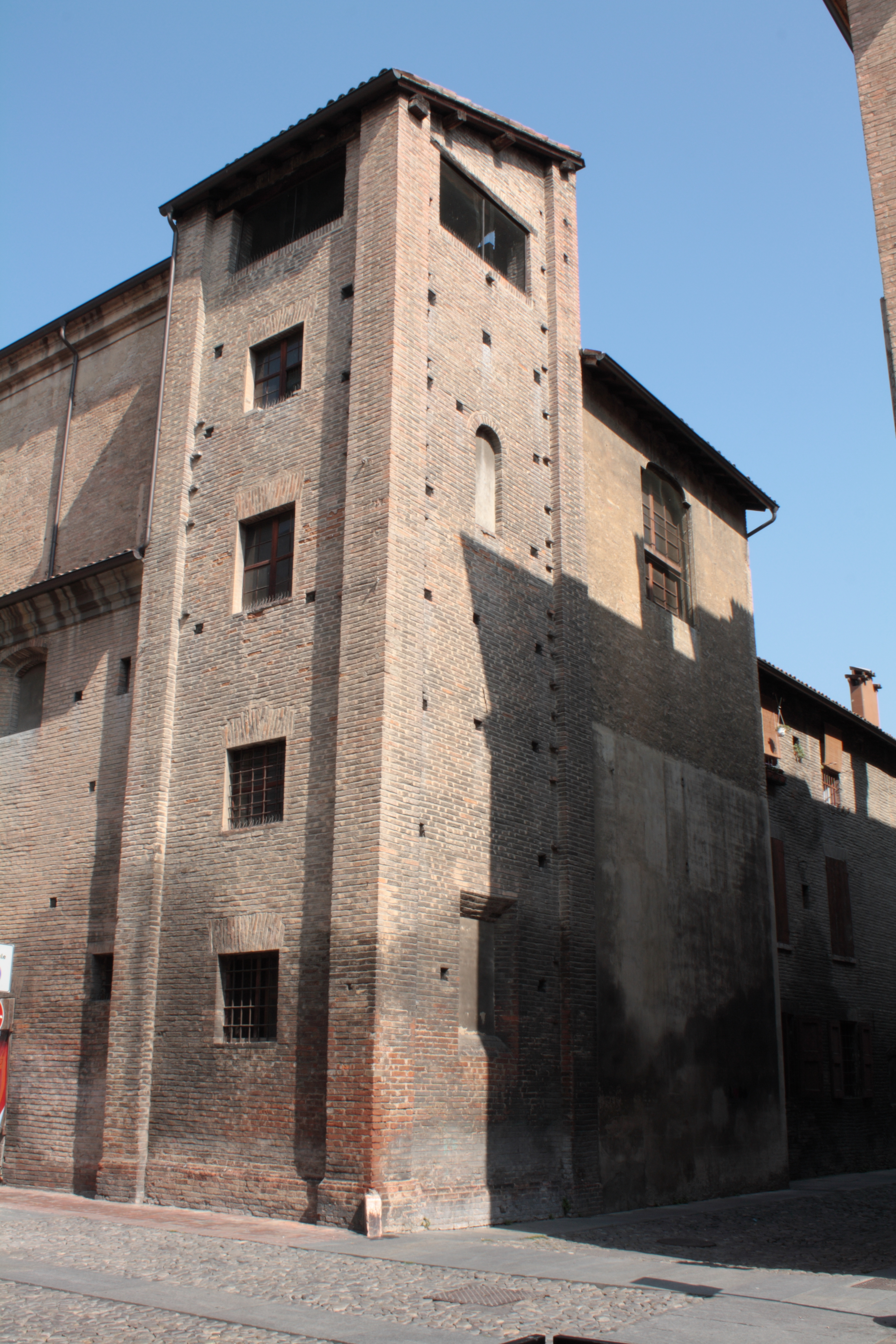
