= Bernardino Cervi =

Italian painter

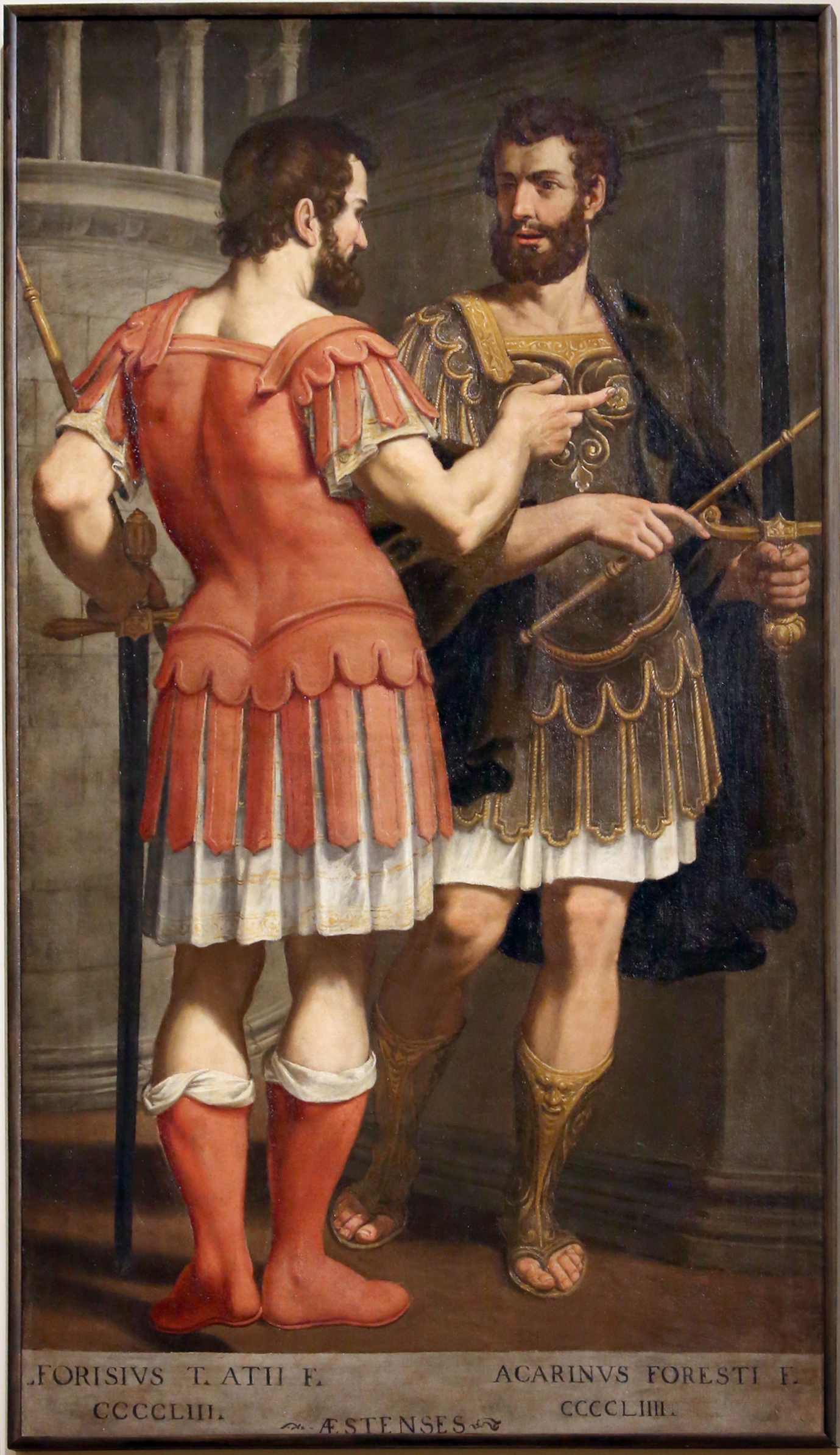
Ideal portraits, Galleria Estense

Bernardino Cervi or Cerva was an Italian painter of the Baroque period.

Native of Modena, and a scholar of Guido Reni. He possessed an extraordinary genius, and, in the judgment of his excellent instructor, would have reached a high rank in art, had he not been cut off in the prime of his life by the plague, which visited Modena in 1630. His principal works are his frescoes in the cathedral at Modena, in the churches of which city there are some altar-pieces by him, including a series on the Life of St Sebastian in the church of Santa Maria della Pomposa and a Deposition from the Cross in the Este Gallery. There is a print by him, the Martyrdom of St. Sebastian with his name abridged, and the date 1628.
