= Serafino Cerva =

Ragusan historian

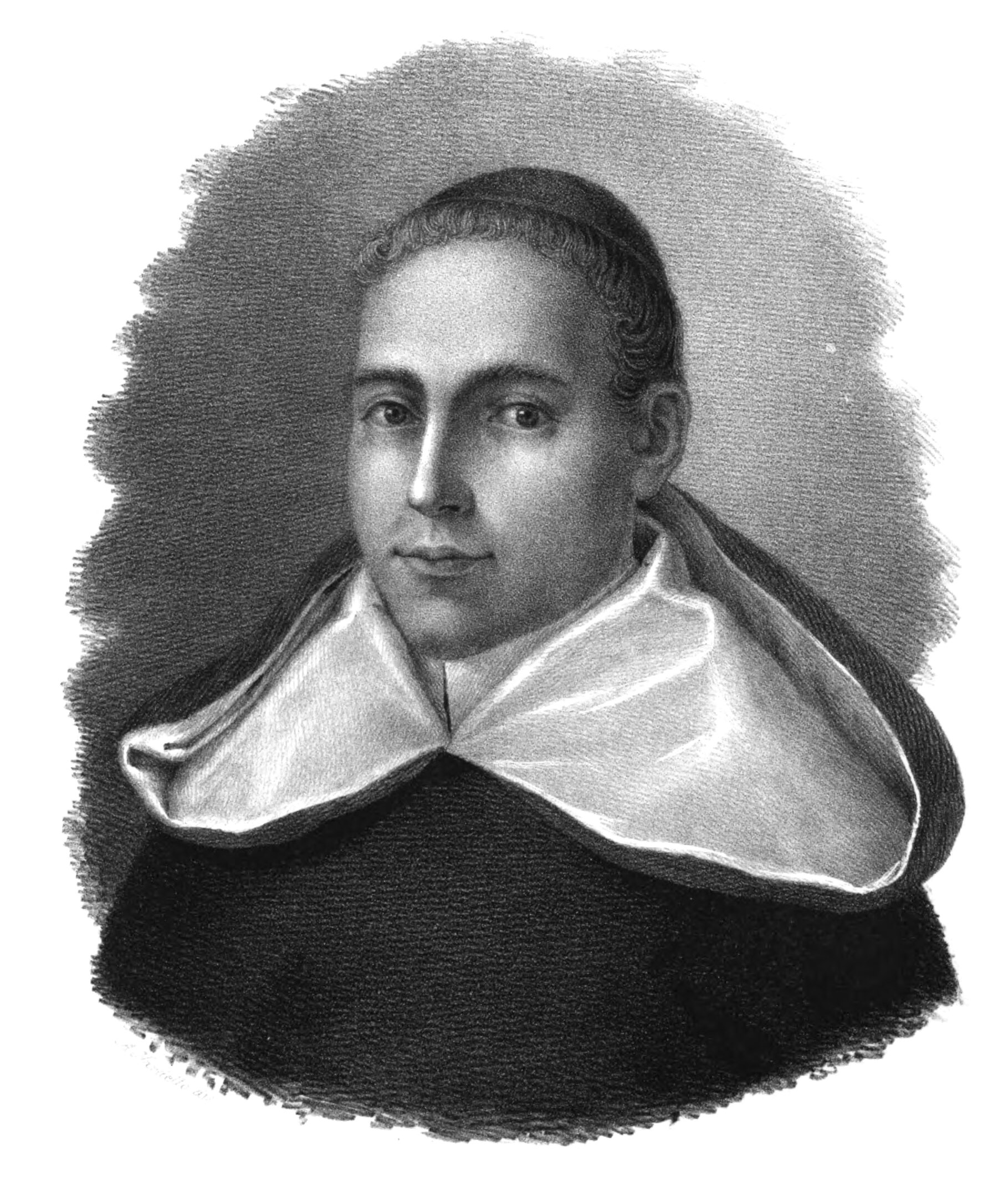
19th-century portrait of Cerva

Serafino Cerva (Croatian: Serafin Marija Crijević; 1686–1759), also known as Saro, was a Ragusan historian and biographer. He was a member of the Cerva family. He wrote the Ragusan Library (Bibliotheca Ragusina), which comprised 435 biographies of Ragusan writers. The extensive text remained in manuscript until it was published in 1975–1980 in 3 volumes, edited by Stjepan Krasić.

== See also ==
- List of notable Ragusans
