= Cerva family =

Historical Austrian noble family

Cerva Crijević
- Country: Republic of Ragusa; Austria-Hungary
- Titles: Counts
- Cadet branches: Sorgo-Cerva (Sorkočević-Crijević)

The House of Cerva or Crijević (Latin: Cervinus, also spelt Cereva, Cerieva, Creve, Crieva, Crevice) was a Ragusan noble family from Ragusa (modern Dubrovnik), which held noble titles in the Republic of Ragusa, and in the Austrian and Austro-Hungarian empires. Descendants of the family live in Austria and Italy.

== History ==
The family is traditionally considered to be one of the founders of Ragusa (Dubrovnik), arriving as refugees from Epidaurum (modern Cavtat) after its destruction by the Slavs and Avars in the 7th century. The Almanach de Gotha enumerates the Cerva among eleven older "native" families of Patrician status. It was first mentioned in 1234. During the Renaissance they used to be considered heirs of the ancient Roman family Cervia (or Cervius).

In the 14th and 15th centuries, the Cerva gave the Republic of Ragusa 419 senior civil officials, representing 4.75% of the total. Similarly, between 1440 and 1640 they counted 109 members of the Great Council (4.95%), 209 senators (6.40%), 121 members of the Minor Council (5.59%), 56 Guardians of Justice (6.82%) and 132 times one of them became a Rector Respublicae (Chancellor of the Republic) (5.54%).

After the fall of the Republic of Ragusa in 1808, the nobility status of the Cerva was recognized by the Austrian Empire in 1817 and was ratified with the title of counts. The main branch in Dubrovnik became extinct in the 19th century, but descendants of the family branches live in Austria and Italy.

== Branches ==
The Cerva were throughout their history an influential and wealthy family in Ragusa, divided into various branches and combined with other noble families of the town by a series of weddings, which in turn gave rise to additional branches of the house.

=== Sorgo-Cerva ===
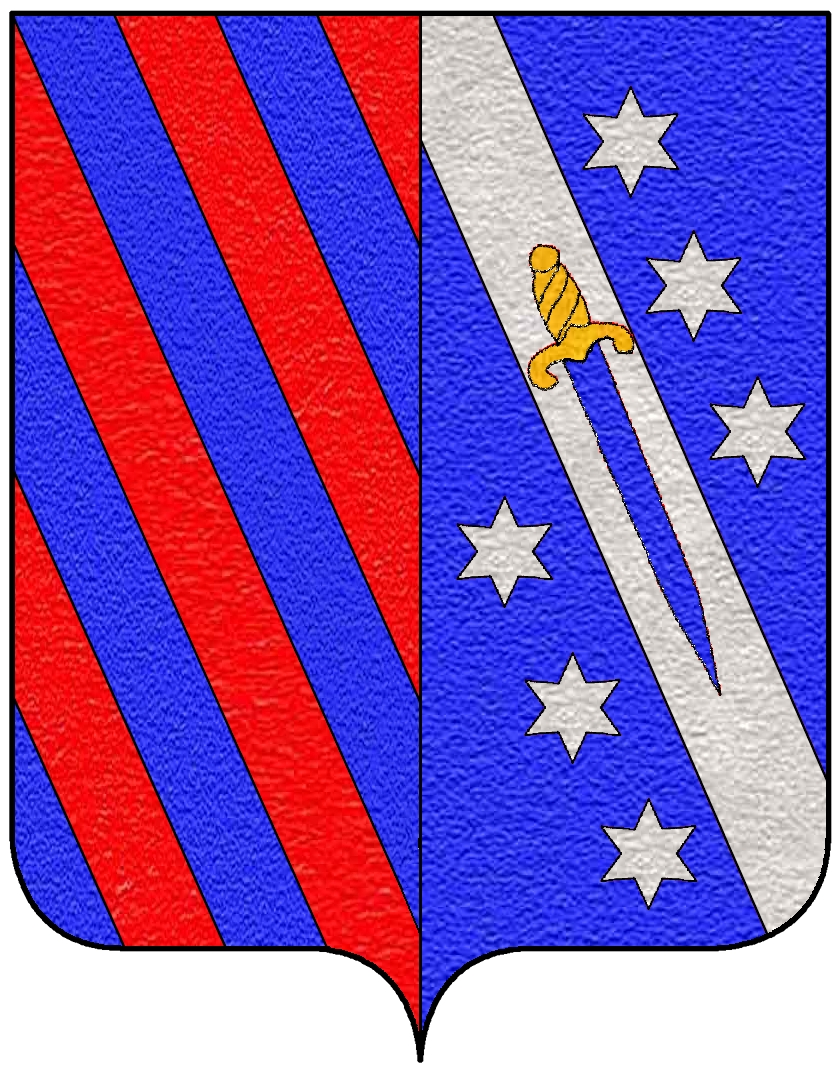
Coat of arms of the Sorgo-Cerva.

A branch of the Cerva family married into the Sorgo family, creating a new branch known as the Sorgo-Cerva (Croatian: Sorkočević-Crijević).

== Notable people ==
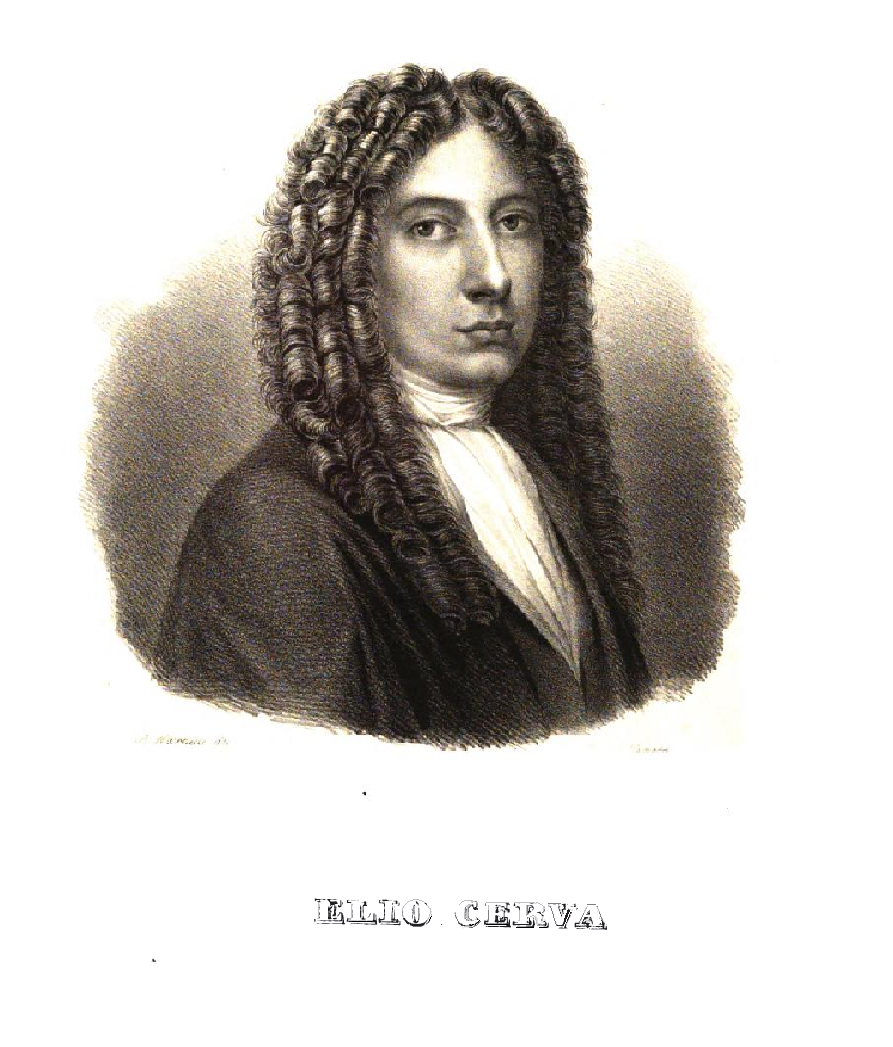
A portrait of Elio Cerva.

- Ludovicus Tubero (1455–1527), Latinist and historian. Between 1490 and 1522 he wrote his most famous work, the Commentaria de temporibus suis, for which he was called Sallustio Raguseo ('Ragusan Sallust').
- Elio Lampridio Cerva (1463–1520), Humanist and lexicographer. Arrived in Rome when he was just a child he grew up at the court of Pope Sixtus IV studying Roman Academy of Pomponio Leto. Here he became one of the greatest Latin language poets of those years.
- Tommaso Cerva or Toma Crijević (16th century), Dominican, lawyer, bishop of Trebinje and Mercana, director of the church of Ston between 1541 and 1559 and general vicar of the archbishop of Dubrovnik, Giovanni Angelo Medici, who became Pope Pius IV in 1559.
- Serafino Cerva or Serafin Crijević (1696–1759), historian, translator of several works from Italian to Latin. He also wrote in Latin "Monumenta Congregationis di Sancti Dominici Ragusanae", "The sacred city of Dubrovnik" and "Bibliotheca Ragusina, in qua Ragusi scriptores, eorum gesta et scripta recensetur" later known under the title "Vite de uomini illustri Ragusei". His works have remained unpublished and are held in the Convent of St. Dominic in Dubrovnik. He died in 1759.

== See also ==
- Republic of Ragusa
- Dubrovnik
- Dalmatia
- History of Dalmatia
- Post-Roman patriciates

== Sources ==
- (in Italian) Francesco Maria Appendini, Notizie istorico-critiche sulle antichità storia e letteratura de' Ragusei, (Dalle stampe di Antonio Martecchini), Ragusa 1803
- (in Italian) Renzo de' Vidovich, Albo d'Oro delle famiglie nobili patrizie e illustri nel Regno di Dalmazia, Fondazione Scientifico Culturale Rustia Traine, Trieste 2004
- Simeon Gliubich, Biographical dictionary of illustrious Dalmatian men, Vienna-Zadar 1836
- Giorgio Gozzi, the free and sovereign Republic of Ragusa 634-1814, Volpe Editore, Rome 1981
- (in Italian) Robin Harris, Storia e vita di Ragusa - Dubrovnik, la piccola Repubblica adriatica, Santi Quaranta, Treviso 2008
- (in Italian) Konstantin Jireček, L’eredità di Roma nelle città della Dalmazia durante il medioevo, 3 voll., AMSD, Rome 1984-1986
