= Elio Lampridio Cerva =

Ragusan poet and humanist

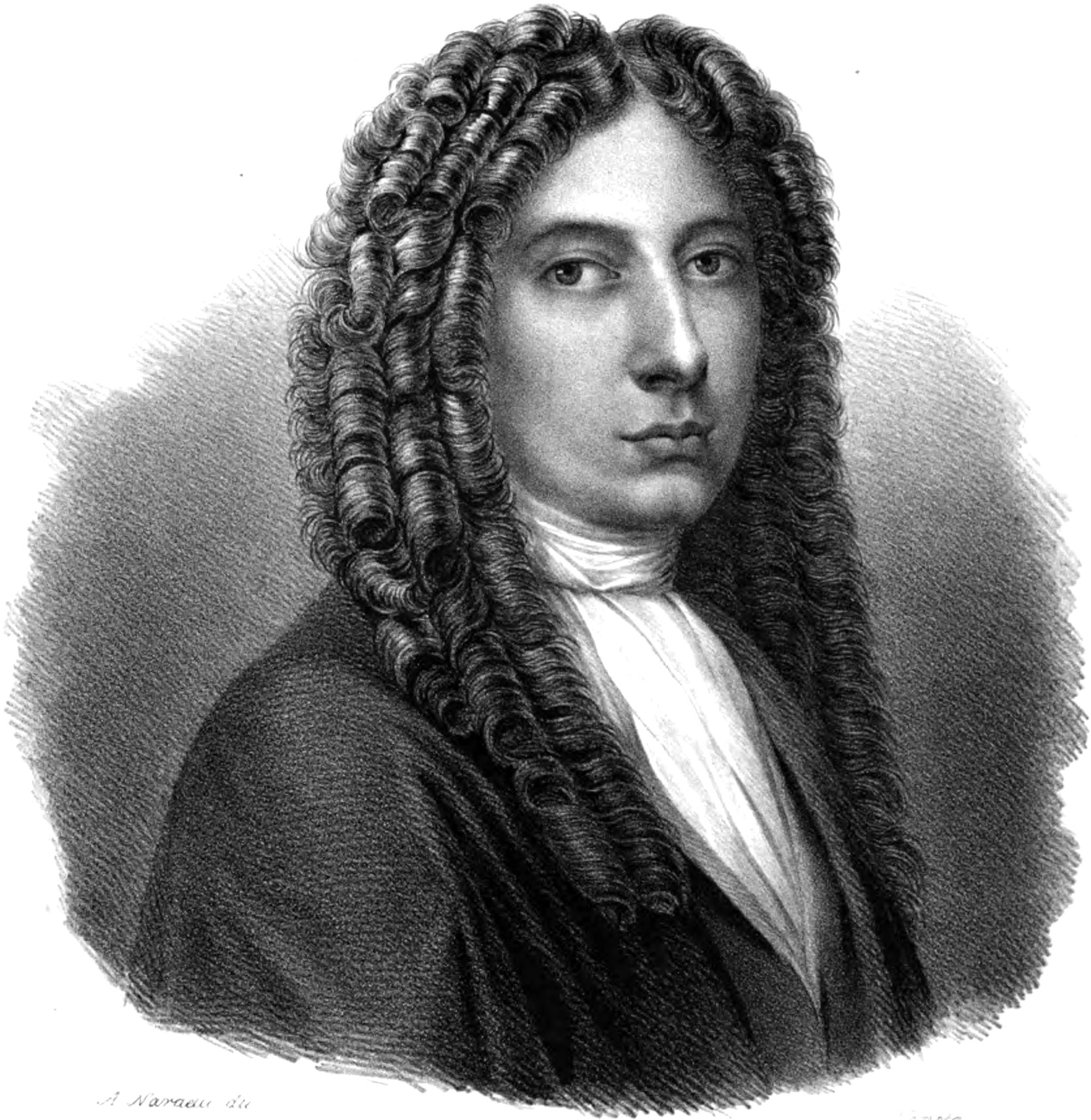
- Elio Lampridio Cerva
- Born: 1463; Ragusa, Republic of Ragusa (modern Dubrovnik, Croatia)
- Died: 1520 (aged 56–57); Ombla river island
- Occupation: Poet
- Writing career
- Genre: Latin Laudes
- Notable work: De Epidauro
- Movement: Accademia Romana

Elio Lampridio Cervino or Cerva (Latin: Aelius Lampridius Cervinus, Croatian: Ilija Crijević; 1463–1520) was a Ragusan poet and proponent of the Latin language.

== Life ==
Cerva was born in 1463 to a prominent noble family of Ragusa, the House of Cerva.

He was sent to Rome as a child to succeed his uncle Stephan, ambassador to Pope Sixtus IV. There, in proximity to Julius Pomponius Laetus, he studied ancient drama and the comedies of Plautus. While in Rome he created Lexicon (1480), a 429-page encyclopedic dictionary in Latin, in quarto format (33 x 23 cm).

He returned to Ragusa in 1490, became a spokesman for the Republic, and later retired to the Ombla river island, where he remained until his death in 1520.

== Works ==
Cerva published only four short components in his lifetime, all in Latin. His main work, De Epidauro, was a draft of an epic poem about the Ottoman invasions of Ragusan territory.

A staunch supporter of Latin, he disliked Slavic, which was commonly spoken in the Republic. He declared his nostalgia for the times when Latin was the only official language in Ragusa, and wished not to hear the "infecting Slavic language". He spoke and wrote solely in Latin.

Latin: «In speciem magnae deducta propagine Romae. Nec sapio Illyriam, sed uiuo et tota Latina Maiestate loquor.»
English: «Now I shine as descendant of the great Rome. I don't know Illyric, but I speak and I live in the entire majesty of Latin.»

— Cerva, De Epidauro et Ad Sanctum Blasium pro Rhacusa

== See also ==
- List of Ragusans
