= Allosemitism =

Jews as Other

Allosemitism is a neologism that encompasses both philosemitic and antisemitic attitudes towards Jews as the Other.

== Origin of term ==
The term was coined by Polish Jewish literary critic Artur Sandauer and popularized by the Polish Jewish sociologist Zygmunt Bauman. Sandauer used the term "allosemitism" in his essay On Situation of Polish Writer of Jewish Descent In the 20th Century published as a book in 1982.

Zygmunt Bauman proposed the term in his 1997 essay "Allosemitism: Premodern, Modern, Postmodern" in which he argued that "allosemitism" should be used in place of "antisemitism". Bauman's argument was that allosemitism can represent a "radically ambivalent attitude" encompassing both philo-Semitism and anti-Semitism; allosemitism is a form of what he called "proteophobia", fear and horror of things that defy clean-cut categories, not, like anti-Semitism, of a simple fear of the "other"; and that Judeophobia is diverse, and, therefore, not adequately encompassed by the term "anti-Semitism".

Ruth Gruber describes the neologism as a response to "the idea that, good or bad, Jews are different from the non-Jewish mainstream and thus unable to be dealt with in the same way or measured by the same yardstick". According to Gruber, the term was coined by the Polish-Jewish literary critic Artur Sandauer.

In her 2010 book Modernism, Feminism, and Jewishness, the literary scholar Maren Tova Linnett described the term as having originated with both Sandauer and Bauman.

== Use ==
Linnett uses the term "to describe the multiple modes of difference that these women authors ascribed to the Jew in order to complicate what she views as the overly simplistic polarities of anti-Semitism and philo-Semitism".

The sociologist Eliezer Ben-Rafael uses the concept in his 2014 book Confronting Allosemitism in Europe: The Case of Belgian Jews.

== See also ==
- Ambivalent prejudice
- Aversive racism
- Benevolent prejudice
- Jewish stereotypes
- Model minority
- Neo-orientalism
- Tokenism
