= Symbolic racism =

Belief system

Symbolic racism (also known as modern-symbolic racism, modern racism, symbolic prejudice, and racial resentment) is a coherent belief system that reflects an underlying one-dimensional prejudice towards a racialized ethnicity. Symbolic racism is more of a general term than it is one specifically related to prejudice towards Black people. These beliefs may cause the subject to discriminate against black people and to justify this discrimination. Some people do not view symbolic racism as prejudice since it is not linked directly to race but is indirectly linked through social and political issues.

David O. Sears and P.J. Henry in 2008 characterize symbolic racism as the expression or endorsement of four specific themes or beliefs:

1. Black people no longer face much prejudice or discrimination.
2. The failure of black people to progress results from their unwillingness to work hard enough.
3. Black people are demanding too much too fast.
4. Black people have gotten more than they deserve.

Symbolic racism is a form of modern implicit racism, as it is more subtle and indirect than more overt forms of racism, such as Jim Crow laws. As symbolic racism develops through socialization and its processes occur without conscious awareness, an individual with symbolically racist beliefs may genuinely oppose racism and believe they are not racist. Symbolic racism is perhaps the most prevalent contemporary form of racism.

The concept of symbolic racism has been criticized for being inconsistent in measurement and concept over time. New experiments also provide evidence that responses do not differ when groups other than African Americans are referenced.

== Definition ==
In the aftermath of the Civil Rights Movement, old-fashioned racism declined along with racial segregation in the United States. Some people believe that newer forms of racism began to replace older forms of racism. Symbolic racism is a term that was coined by David Sears and John McConahay in 1973 to explain why most White Americans supported principles of equality for Black Americans, but less than half were willing to support programs designed to implement these principles. The original theory described three definitive aspects of symbolic racism:

1. A new form of racism had replaced old-fashioned Jim Crow racism, as it was no longer popular and could no longer be influential in politics, as only a small minority still accepted it.
2. Opposition to black politicians and racially targeted policies is more influenced by symbolic racism than by any perceived or true threat to whites' own personal lives.
3. The origins of this form of racism lay in early-socialized negative feelings about blacks associated with traditional conservative values.

The concept of symbolic racism has evolved over time, but most writings currently define symbolic racism as containing four themes:

1. Racial discrimination is no longer a serious obstacle to black people's prospects for a good life.
2. Black people's continuing disadvantages are largely due to their unwillingness to work hard enough.
3. Black people's continuing demands are unwarranted.
4. Black people's increased advantages are also unwarranted.

== History ==
The term symbolic racism was first implemented in the 1970s, as a way to describe discrimination against Blacks post-Jim Crow. It was used to differentiate between older, more overt forms of racism and newer forms of discrimination. Attacks on busing shortly after integration of schools became widespread have been posited as early examples of symbolic racism. However, Kinder has stated that older forms of racism are still prevalent in modern society.

Following the Jim Crow era, when older, overtly racist business practices were outlawed, some turned to more discreet methods of racism. While realtors in the late 1960s and early 1970s could no longer outright deny selling a home to a Black person because they were Black, they often gave the Black person a higher price point than they would have if they were a white person.

Discrimination also pervaded loan offices, where Black people continued to be less likely to get a meeting with a loan officer, less likely to be approved for a loan, and less likely to receive all the necessary information.

In 1981, Howard Schuman replicated a study originally performed in 1950 to test discrimination in New York City restaurants on the Upper East Side. He discovered only minor changes in discrimination levels.

== Terminology ==
The term symbolic racism derives from the fact that the opinions expressed characterize Black people as an abstract group ("as in the anonymous 'they' in 'if they would only…'") rather than as specific individuals. People hold prejudices because of the cultural stereotypes attributed to the group rather than because of any personal individual experience with the group in question. Researchers have given the concept of symbolic racism many different names, usually to emphasize one aspect over another. These names include modern racism, racial resentment, and laissez-faire racism. While slight differences exist between the different terms, all share the same bottom line of prejudice towards Black people.

While similar in nature, symbolic racism is distinguished from aversive racism based on the relationships between the defining characteristics. Aversive racism involves "separate, disassociated positive and negative components, which are in conflict, and thus, may sometimes be experienced as ambivalence." Symbolic racism, on the other hand, "reflects the unique assimilation of individualistic values and negative racial affect." The components of aversive racism remain disassociated within the individual; whereas, the components of symbolic racism blend to produce racial attitudes. While both types of racism predict similar behavior, they are the consequences of different processes.

== Causes ==
Whitley and Kite cite six underlying factors that contribute to symbolic racism. They are to this day believed to have been some of the biggest influences on modern racism.

1. Implicitly anti-black affect and negative stereotypes.
2. Racialized belief in traditional values.
3. Belief in equality of opportunity.
4. Low belief in equality of outcome.
5. Group self-interest.
6. Low knowledge of black people.

According to Whitley and Kite, those who hold symbolic racist beliefs tend to hold implicitly negative attitudes, most likely gained in childhood, towards Black people that may or may not be conscious. These attitudes may not be characterized by outright hatred but rather fear, disgust, anger, contempt, etc. In addition, those who hold symbolically racist beliefs may also believe in traditional American values such as hard work, individuality, and self-restraint. However, these beliefs become racialized.

Many people believe that Black individuals do not hold or act in accordance with these values but that they instead rely on public assistance, seek government favors, and act impulsively. As Whitley and Kite note, "The fact that White people also accept public assistance, seek government favors, and act impulsively is not relevant to people with symbolic prejudice; it is their perception (usually in stereotypic terms) of Black people's behavior that they focus on." Furthermore, those with symbolic prejudice tend to believe in the equality of opportunity, which includes access to resources such as education, housing, and employment. However, they tend not to believe in equality of outcome. This explains how people can support the principle of racial equality but not support initiatives to achieve it, such as affirmative action. Government intervention when individuals do not have the same talent, effort, or historical background would violate traditional values of equality of opportunity. Thus, "people can simultaneously endorse equality of opportunity and reject government intervention to bring about equality of outcome." Finally, Whitley and Kite state most whites do not have extensive personal experience with Black people, so the negative stereotypes they hold about blacks do not have the opportunity to be dispelled.

== Evidence ==
=== Measures ===
Much of the initial research conducted by researchers on symbolic racism utilized McConahay's (1986) modern racism scale (MRS). However, citing a number of measurement problems, Sears and Henry published the Symbolic Racism 2000 (SR2K) Scale in 2002 in the journal Political Psychology. It consists of a series of statements relating to race and politics in which participants must state their degree of agreement on a scale ranging from "strongly disagree" to "strongly agree". Statements included on surveys by the American National Election Studies and most commonly used in political science research include:

- Irish, Italians, Jewish, and many other minorities overcame prejudice and worked their way up. Blacks should do the same without any special favors.
- Generations of slavery and discrimination have created conditions that make it difficult for Blacks to work their way out of the lower class.
- Over the past few years, Blacks have gotten less than they deserve.
- It's really a matter of some people not trying hard enough; if Blacks would only try harder they could be just as well off as Whites.

This updated scale attempted to address the issues with previous forms of measurement including internal reliability, construct validity, predictive validity, and discriminant validity, and generalizability.

=== Examples ===
Bobocel et al. (1998) found that prejudice can be rationalized as a concern for justice. Opposition to preferential affirmative action programs (which assign more weight to certain demographics and give preference to target groups) was uniquely predicted by an individual's belief in merit principles. That is, regardless of prejudice level, individuals tend to oppose preferential treatment programs because they violate traditional norms of meritocracy. However, the higher an individual's level of prejudice, the more likely he was to construe an undefined affirmative action program (e. g. not necessarily preferential) as violating the merit principle and, in turn, oppose the undefined affirmative action program. These high-prejudice individuals were able to rationalize their prejudice as a concern for justice, although no traditional justice norms had been explicitly violated. In this way, symbolic racism functions through rationalization as a concern for traditional norms without conscious awareness.

Public opinion researchers polled White Americans in the early 1970s on their backing for racial equality and their support for government intervention that would enforce that equality. The results revealed high levels of support from White Americans, ranging from 75% to nearly 100%, regarding the principles for school integration, equal opportunity employment, and open housing. Support from the same White Americans was significantly lower regarding the implementation of more abstract principles at approximately 50%.

College students who had completed a modern-symbolic prejudice measure early in the semester evaluated the résumés of 10 job applicants. The applicants consisted of three qualified Black people, two qualified white people, and five unqualified white people. The students were split into two groups - one containing students rated high in modern-symbolic prejudice and one containing students rated low in this same attribute. Each student received a memo from the president of the company. Half of the students received memos in which the president of the company asked the student to abstain from hiring a worker of a minority group because the person hired would be dealing mainly with white employees. The memo for the second group did not contain this message. The group that did not receive any instructions from the president of the company recommended a Black candidate 61% of the time, regardless of the individual's modern-symbolic prejudice rating. In the group that had received justification from the president to abstain from minority hiring, 37% of the students that were low in modern-symbolic prejudice recommended a Black candidate, whereas only 18% of the students high in modern-symbolic prejudice recommended a Black candidate. These results suggest that symbolic prejudice is expressed most strongly when non-explicitly racist justifications are given for discriminatory action.

=== Other applications ===
While symbolic racism was originally conceptualized as a prejudice specifically against Black people in the United States, scholars have expanded the concept to apply to other groups and locales. In the United States, research has been conducted on symbolic racism as it relates to Latinos and Asians, as well as modern sexism, anti-fat bias, and heterosexism. For example, Mingying Fu conducted an experiment in which symbolic racism was shown to influence attitudes toward out-group members and racial policies. In addition, Fu found that symbolic racism was the strongest predictor of white as well as Asian and Latino opposition to affirmative action after controlling for biological racism and ideology.

Fraser and Islam (2007) applied the concept of symbolic racism to the Aborigines and European Australians in Australia. In this context, the Australian version of the symbolic racism construct is defined as "the use of affective responses and beliefs that are well accepted within a dominant majority racial group as justifying its advantaged position". They measured the relationship between racial prejudice and support for Pauline Hanson's One Nation Party using two postal surveys based on a random sampling of names from electoral registers. Support for Hanson and voting for the One Nation Party were strongly related to a measure of symbolic racism. The study also found a relationship between symbolic racism and a measure of relational orientation, or concern over the position of one's own racial group relative to other racial groups. Fraser and Islam state that this finding suggests that beliefs influenced by symbolic racism may be motivated by social identity-related processes, "where white European Australians regard their culture as the real, mainstream Australian culture, and resent special concessions to groups such as Aborigines and Asian migrants, whom they exclude from their narrow self-identity as Australians."

Examples of symbolic racism also exist in Europe. McLaren (2002) argues that people are hostile towards the European integration due to their perceptions of threats posed by other cultures. In this study, the independent variables to be gauged were the realistic and symbolic perceptions. The response choices for the questions given to his participants were dichotomous for each of these variables. The choices were:

- People from [these] minority groups abuse the system of social benefits.
- The religious practices of people from [these] minority groups threaten our way of life.

The findings suggest that perceived cultural threats appeared to have a strong sway on the attitudes toward the European Union. It was concluded that attitudes toward the European Union were largely based on a general hostility towards other cultures.

== Consequences ==
Symbolic racism may have implications for legal policies. Green et al. (2006) found a positive correlation between symbolic racism and more severe crime policies, such as capital punishment and three-strikes laws, and a negative relationship with policies that are intended to assist criminals such as inmate education.

Individual prejudices and opposition to programs to eliminate inequality of outcomes may contribute to institutional racism, which in turn leads to continued racial inequality. Additionally, within American society, institutionalized practices have been influenced by structural racism resulting in "the subordination and devaluation of minority groups".

It has been argued that common ways the media framed former U.S. President Barack Obama have helped shaped many audiences' attitudes in ways that support symbolically racist beliefs, such as the idea that America is currently in a post-racial society where discrimination is no longer a concern. When comparing positively framed news stories about Obama to negatively framed news stories about Obama, it was seen in a study of 168 participants that symbolically racist beliefs increased.

Reyna et al. (2009) found that negative attitudes towards rap music are associated with the idea that African Americans are to blame for their economic plights. The type of rap that was looked at was categorized as gangster rap, which is notorious for its violent undertones and explicit language. Additionally, in their second study, they found that anti-rap attitudes are also associated with discrimination towards African Americans. Conversely, when looking at other predominantly Black genres of music, such as jazz or gospel music, the same correlations were not found.

== Criticisms and controversies ==
A major criticism is that new experimental studies show that respondents do not answer the questions presented in the paper by Sears and Henry (2002) differently when groups other than African Americans are mentioned in the survey questions. This potentially undermines a primary claim made by Sears and Henry - that their measure of symbolic racism is a blend of "anti-Black affect" and "conservatism". Enos and Carney (2018) write:

Across multiple groups and multiple samples on different survey platforms, we find a strong an consistent pattern: the results obtained using groups other than Blacks are substantially indistinguishable from those measured when Blacks are the target group. Decomposing this measure further, we find that political conservatives express only minor differences in resentment across target groups. Far greater differences in resentment toward Blacks and other groups can be found among racially sympathetic liberals. In short, we find that modern racism questions appear to measure attitudes toward any group, rather than African Americans alone.

One criticism of symbolic racism is that it has been conceptualized and measured inconsistently over time. Sometimes it has been conceptualized as consisting of a single construct and other times as consisting of multiple subdimensions. Most scholars now consistently describe symbolic racism as being composed of the four major components listed by Tarman and Sears. Tarman and Sears posit that consistently defining it as based on those four themes will eliminate the inconsistency problems. The updated symbolic racism scale, Symbolic Racism 2000 (SR2K), is believed to have addressed many issues in measurement inconsistency.

Another criticism is that symbolic racism is not "true" racism but, rather, is a manifestation of conservative political ideology. For instance, if one believes that a group should receive "special favors" they would answer the question in a manner coded as more racially resentful. Tarman and Sears evaluated this claim and concluded that symbolic racism is an independent belief system encompassing discrete attitudes from those of conservatives.

Some scholars have suggested that the focus has moved prematurely from purportedly older forms of racism to modern racism. In a qualitative study, Mellor (2003) conducted interviews with Aboriginal Australians in which he found that many experience racism and that much of it seems to be old-fashioned rather than modern. He argues that social scientists may have embraced forms of modern racism too quickly, which could have negative impacts on minorities by helping to maintain discriminatory social institutions.

== See also ==
- Ambivalent prejudice
- Benevolent prejudice
- In-group favoritism
- Out-group homogeneity
- Social dominance theory
- Racism in the United States
- Ultimate attribution error
- Southern strategy
