= Principle-policy puzzle =

Political science concept

In political science, a principle-policy puzzle, also known as a principle-policy gap or a principle-policy paradox is a disconnect between support for a principle and support for a policy supporting that principle.

The primary example is the apparent inconsistency between American support of the principle of racial equality, and lack of support of a policy intended to achieve racial equality, especially among those most politically aware. The seeming paradox is explained by noting that lack of support for affirmative action comes from conservative ideology, such that opponents of government policies intended to realize racial equality are not necessarily hypocrites. Individuals may also agree with the principle but feel that the policies do not actually help to achieve the stated principle. Racial resentment has also been suggested as a major contributor to the puzzle.

A more global example is the strong international desire for a clean and health environment compared to the lack of enthusiasm for the type of regulations and taxes that would be needed to achieve this.
