= Aversive racism =

Form of ambivalent racial prejudice

Aversive racism is a social scientific theory proposed by Samuel L. Gaertner & John F. Dovidio (1986), according to which negative evaluations of racial/ethnic minorities are realized by a persistent avoidance of interaction with other racial and ethnic groups. As opposed to traditional, overt racism, which is characterized by overt hatred for and discrimination against racial/ethnic minorities, aversive racism is characterized by more complex, ambivalent expressions and attitudes nonetheless with prejudicial views towards other races. Aversive racism arises from unconscious personal beliefs taught during childhood. Subtle racist behaviors are usually targeted towards African Americans. Workplace discrimination is one of the best examples of aversive racism. Biased beliefs on how minorities act and think affect how individuals interact with minority members.

Aversive racism was coined by Joel Kovel to describe the subtle racial behaviors of any ethnic or racial group who rationalize their aversion to a particular group by appeal to rules or stereotypes (Dovidio & Gaertner, p. 62). People who behave in an aversively racist way may profess egalitarian beliefs, and will often deny their racially motivated behavior; nevertheless they may change their behavior when dealing with a member of a minority group. The motivation for the change is thought to be implicit or subconscious. Though Kovel coined the term, most of the research has been done by John F. Dovidio and Samuel L. Gaertner.

== Implicit versus explicit racism ==
The social and political movements to eliminate racism in society have decreased overt displays of racism, known as explicit racism. Explicit racism includes any speech or behaviors that demonstrate a conscious acknowledgement of racist attitudes and beliefs. By contrast, implicit racism includes unconscious biases, expectations, or tendencies that exist within an individual, regardless of ill-will or any self-aware prejudices.

The passage of civil rights legislation and socially enforced taboos against explicit racism have served to inhibit direct outward expressions of prejudice against minorities over the last several decades. But forms of implicit racism including aversive racism, symbolic racism, and ambivalent prejudice, may have come to replace these overt expressions of prejudice. Research has not revealed a downward trend in implicit racism that would mirror the decline of explicit racism.

Furthermore, implicit racism, when explicit racism is absent or rare, raises new issues. When surveyed about their attitudes concerning the racial climate in America, black people and white people had largely different perceptions, with black people viewing racial discrimination as far more impactful on income and education disparities, and being far less satisfied in general with the treatment of minorities in America. One explanation for this is that because explicit racism is so much less prevalent, Whites no longer perceive directly the ways that prejudice leaves its mark on American society; minorities, on the other hand, still recognize or feel the implicit racism behind certain interracial interactions.

== Measuring implicit bias ==
Several methods have been employed to measure implicit racism. Although explicit racism can be measured easily by surveying people's attitudes and beliefs about other races, implicit racism is by its nature more elusive, and requires more subtle strategies for its measurement.

One of the most prevalent ways of assessing implicit racism is through response latency procedures, such as the implicit-association test (IAT). In an IAT measuring implicit racism, individuals will be shown images and asked to press the same key for an image of a black person and/or a word that indicates something good, and another key for an image of a white person or something bad. These pairs will also be tested in reverse order (one key for a white person or something good, another for a black person or something bad). The greater the disparity in reaction times and accuracy between the different pair groups, the greater implicit racism is measured in that individual. Though there has been significant academic and popular debate regarding its validity, reliability, and usefulness in assessing implicit bias.

Other ways of measuring implicit racism include physiological measures (such as tracking people's heart rates), memory tasks and indirect self-report measures. Collectively, these implicit attitude measures provide a strong means of identifying aversive racism. A truly non-prejudiced person will score well on both measures of explicit prejudice and implicit prejudice. An aversively racist person, but not a person who is overtly racist, will instead score low on measures of explicit prejudice, yet not on measures of implicit prejudice.

== Studies ==
In an experiment conducted by Gaertner and Dovidio in 2000, white college students were asked to assess the credentials and to make hiring recommendations for prospective white and black job candidates with either strong, weak, or marginal credentials. The results showed no overt discrimination when the applicants had strong or weak credentials. Signs of aversive racism appeared only when the applicants possessed marginal credentials. Black candidates were recommended more than 20% less than the white candidates who had the same marginal credentials.

Dovidio and Gaertner showed evidence of aversive racism in the 1970s and 1980s with their field research. People from a list of conservative and liberal political parties in Brooklyn, New York was called by a "wrong number" caller, a confederate to the researcher, attempting to get hold of a mechanic to come to help them with their broken-down car. The confederate called from a payphone and was out of change to make another call and asked the participant to make the call for them. The independent variable, or the variable the experimenter changed, was the dialect of the confederate to convince the participant that the "wrong number" caller was either white or black. It was also noted how many people just hung up the phone when they found it was a wrong number.

Conservatives were significantly less helpful to people perceived as black, helping out those perceived as white 92% of the time compared with 65% of the time for those perceived as black (Dovidio & Gaertner, p. 69). The liberals helped white people 85% of the time and black people 75% of the time (Dovidio & Gaertner, p. 69). However, people from the liberal party hung up prematurely on black people 19% versus 3% of the time for white people, while the conservatives prematurely hung up on 8% of black people and 5% of white people (Dovidio & Gaertner, p. 69).

== Psychology ==
Dovidio and Gaertner introduced three psychological supports for aversive racism. As humans, people are predisposed to cognitive categorization, and categorizing people into different groups allows people to see the differences that exist between other groups compared to the groups they identify with. By recognizing these differences, people are then motivated to control the environment around them when they interact with outgroups. This motivation is desirable because people desire positive interactions, especially with minorities. The most influential psychological support is the socialization of two sets of incompatible values. Americans, as children, are brought up being taught to have an egalitarian belief system. They want justice and equality for all minorities. They are also taught about the racial traditions that symbolize American history. These two sets of incompatible values conflict with one another, resulting in inconsistent behavior towards members of outgroups. They feel the internal negative affect based on these two sets of values and it comes out in their behaviors and attitudes toward other people. Prejudice has been a wide phenomenon while racism is a broader topic that connects individual beliefs and behavior to broader social norms and practices that disadvantage particular groups.

== Consequences ==
Because aversively racist people endorse egalitarian values, their biases do not manifest in situations where there are clear social norms of right and wrong. A wide variety of empirical research supports the effects of nonconscious prejudice on the behavior of people aversively racist tendencies. These studies include experiments in emergency and nonemergency helping behaviors, selection decisions in employment and college decisions, interpersonal judgments, and policy and legal decisions.

=== Selection decisions in employment and admissions ===
Aversive racism can have serious implications for selection decisions. According to the aversive racism framework, discrimination should occur in situations in which decision can be ostensibly be based on factors other than race. Dovidio and Gaertner (2000) created just such a condition. College students were asked to make hiring recommendations for a campus position. In the first condition, one candidate was clearly more qualified than the other. In the second condition, candidates' credentials were more evenly matched with no clear optimal choice. As expected, the first condition revealed no racial bias. Participants consistently chose the more qualified candidate. However, in the latter condition, as predicted, participants recommended the white candidate over the black in substantially more cases. Even in the face of similar credentials, participants ostensibly justified their discrimination on the grounds of other, non-racial factors.

A similar experiment conducted by Hodson, Dovidio, and Gaertner (2002) replicated similar findings in college admission decisions. Participants were separated into two groups depending on whether they scored high or low on a self-report measure of racial prejudice. They were then asked to evaluate a group of students for college admission. The students had either high SAT scores and strong high-school grades or only strong scores in one of the two categories. As expected, there was no bias in admission decisions when the student had strong grades combined with high SAT scores. The bias revealed itself only when students were only strong in one of these areas. In these cases, substantially more black students were rejected. Even more convincingly, prejudiced participants inconsistently reported to place more value on the particular score that the black students performed poorly in. When black students had moderate SAT scores, this was cited as a reason for their denial whereas when they had moderate grades and a higher SAT score, prejudiced participants reversed their values to support their discriminatory behavior. Minorities are at a disadvantage when taking standardized tests such as the GRE or SAT. Many minority students are impoverished and are not able to afford a proper education. Also, there is the matter that the experiences of minorities differs greatly from White Americans, which hurt the test scores of minorities. One study found that minority members lack the knowledge of being accepted to college or for a masters due to not having a family member that has been in the same situation. White Americans have the privilege of having more knowledge about getting accepted into higher education due to being more well off than minorities.

Of note is the fact that the study of white college students' assessments of applications was run at the same college in both 1989 and 1999, with little change found, and meta-analysis of 40 years worth of studies in the area has shown next to no improvement (Saucier, Miller, & Doucet, 2005). Because aversive racism is neither conscious nor blatantly apparent to others, it is able to survive largely unchallenged by societal pressure for egalitarianism. Thus, outgroups, particularly racial minorities, can be subject to disadvantageous selection processes.

Aversive racism still affects the workplace in today's modern society. A different take on racism has been observed known as unconscious racist bias. Workplace discrimination takes place due to racial beliefs that the majority share in society. For example, a lot of minority members are poor, but views that believe that all minorities are poor and uneducated is not respectable at all. African Americans are not looked upon favorable, which makes employment a bigger challenge than it already is. Media outlets portray African Americans with negative adjectives such as poor or incompetent. The constant negative representation of African Americans causes a division among what is true or subtle racism. However, when status and achievements are equal, race does not affect employment decisions for African Americans.

=== Legal decisions ===

Aversive racism may have similar negative implications for bias in legal decisions. Johnson and colleagues examined the effects of introducing damaging inadmissible evidence on the judgments of white jurors. The race of the defendant was manipulated to be either black or white. When exposed to only admissible evidence, jurors were not affected by the race of the defendant and perceived both whites and blacks as equally guilty. The researchers demonstrated that, when exposed to incriminating evidence that the court deems inadmissible, white jurors found black defendants more guilty, but showed no similar effect on their judgments of white defendants. Consistent with the non-racial justifications given by participants in Gaertner and Dovidio's (2000) study, the participants in this study claimed to be less affected by the inadmissible evidence in the scenario where the defendant was black than when the defendant was white, displaying once again the subconscious nature of this racial discrimination. Minorities suffer more incarcerations when being judged of a crime. One study found that African Americans were more likely to receive the death penalty as compared to White Americans. African Americans are 4 times as likely to receive the death penalty than White Americans. The race of the defendant plays a huge role in determining the length of their sentence. However, it is not always the case that black defendants receive harsher treatment than white defendants. In some cases white defendants receive worse punishments than black defendants. The experimenters in the study believed that in these cases, black participants focus more on race due to strong relations within their in-group.

=== Interaction ===
Because of the subtle and varied nature of these biases, aversive racism not only systematically influences decision making but can also fundamentally impact everyday social relations in ways that contribute substantially to misunderstandings and mistrust in intergroup relations.

Studies of nonverbal cues have shown repeatedly that less conscious or vigilantly controlled displays of discomfort increase in aversively racist Whites when interacting with Blacks, even when a concerted effort is being made and the white participants reported liking the black participants. Dovidio et al. found that negative implicit attitudes were correlated with nonverbal cues of discomfort such as increased rates of blinking and decreased eye contact in interactions with blacks. Those observing the nonverbal cues may often receive very mixed messages. Consistent with this reasoning, Dovidio, Kawakami, and Gaertner (2002) found that racial majority and racial minority members often based their perceptions of interracial interactions on two different sources of information, with white people relying more on verbal behavior and black people more on nonverbal behaviors. In their experiment, black and white participants engaged in paired conversations and then provided their assessments of the interaction. Consistent with the aversive racism framework, black participants rated a white partner's friendliness as a function of their nonverbal behaviors and implicit attitudes while white participants rated their own friendliness based on the verbal content of their conversation. Thus, participants left the same interaction with differing perceptions.

=== Teamwork ===
Understandably, with the negative effects of aversive racism on interracial interaction, interracial teamwork can suffer greatly from aversive racism. The discomfort detected through subtle, nonverbal cues that goes unaddressed openly can easily cause distrust between two individuals. When these individuals are members of the same team, or office, or project it can result in less effective communication and strained relations. This, of course, can drastically decrease the quality of work produced by the team. In one study reported by Dovidio et al. (2002), when paired together on a problem-solving task, teams consisting of a black participant and a non-prejudiced white participant did much better than those with a black participant and an aversively racist white participant. Surprisingly, however, teams with an overtly prejudiced white participant and a black participant showed greater efficiency on the task than teams that included an aversively racist white participant. Theoretically, the mixed messages and impressions in interaction made these teams less effective.

The consequences of these restrictive circumstances may be problematic. In any workplace where a racial minority does significant work in teams, that work is at risk of being of lesser quality objectively than a white co-worker's. One substantial contributing factor may be that minority workers might often be working with a white co-worker where the tension or implicitly biased responses by that co-worker impacts their performance. The white co-workers, on the other hand, work predominantly with other white co-workers and may be unhindered by such interracial dynamics, allowing them to perform comparatively more efficiently.

== In popular culture ==
Aversive racism has been hypothesized in the 2008 presidential elections with the emergence of the first biracial candidate, Barack Obama. During the latter half of the campaign, Obama showed a decent lead in the polls ranging anywhere from 2–10%. A survey conducted by Stanford University claimed support for Obama would have been "six percentage points higher if he were white". The New York Times journalist, Nicholas Kristof stated that "most of the votes that Mr. Obama actually loses will belong to well-meaning whites who believe in racial equality and have no objections to electing a black person as president – yet who discriminate unconsciously".

== Combating aversive racism ==
=== Re-directing ingroup bias ===
Several possibilities exist for how to combat aversive racism. One method looks to the cognitive foundations of prejudice. The basic socio-cognitive process of creating in-groups and out-groups is what leads many to identify with their own race while feeling averted to other races, or out-group members. According to the common ingroup identity model inducing individuals to recategorize themselves and others as part of a larger, superordinate group can lead to more positive attitudes towards members of a former out-group. Research has shown this model to be effective. This shows that changing the in-group criteria from race to something else that includes both groups, implicit biases can be diminished. This does not mean that each group has to necessarily relinquish subgroup identities. According to the common ingroup identity model, individuals can retain their original identity while simultaneously harboring a larger more inclusive identity – a dual identity representation.

=== Acknowledging and addressing unconscious bias ===
Other research has indicated that, although often preferred by explicitly nonprejudiced people and seen to be an egalitarian approach, adopting a "colorblind" approach to interracial interactions has actually proven to be detrimental. While minorities often prefer to have their racial identity recognized, people who employ the "colorblind" approach can generate greater feelings of distrust and impressions of prejudice in interracial interactions. Thus, embracing diversity, rather than ignoring the topic, can be seen as one way of improving these interactions.

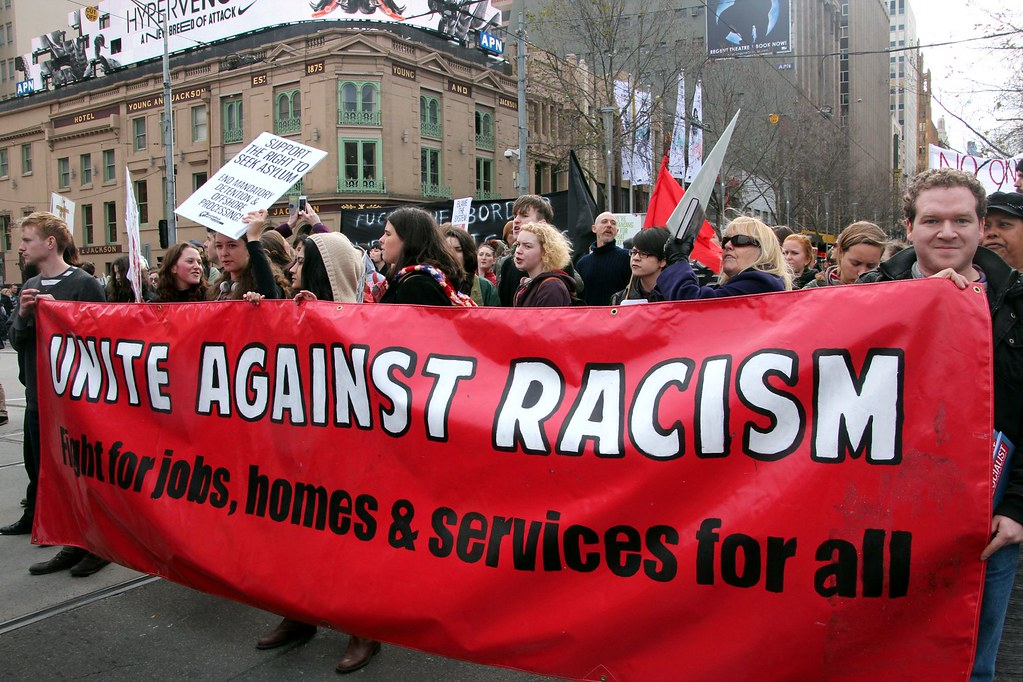
A 2013 protest in Melbourne, Australia

The research of Monteith and Voils has demonstrated that, in aversively racist people, the recognition of disparity between their personal standards and their actual behaviors can lead to feelings of guilt, which in turn causes them to monitor their prejudicial behaviors and perform them less often. Furthermore, when practiced consistently, these monitored behaviors become less and less disparate from the personal standards of the individual, and can eventually even suppress negative responses that were once automatic. This is encouraging, as it suggests that the good intentions of aversively racist people can be used to help eliminate their implicit prejudices.

Some research has directly supported this notion. In one study, people who scored nonprejudiced (low explicit and implicit racism scores) and as aversively racist people (low explicit but high implicit racism scores) were placed in either a hypocrisy or a control condition. Those in the hypocrisy condition were made to write about some time they had been unfair or prejudiced towards an Asian person, while those in the control group were not. They were then asked to make recommendations for funding to the Asian Students Association. Aversively racist participants in the hypocrisy group made much larger funding recommendations (the highest of any of the four groups, actually) than the aversively racist people in the control group. The nonprejudiced participants, on the other hand, displayed no significant difference in funding recommendations, whether they were in the hypocrisy group or the control group. In another study measuring the correction of implicit bias among aversively racist people, Green et al. examined physicians' treatment recommendations for blacks and whites. While aversively racist people typically recommended an aggressive treatment plan more often for white than for black patients, those who were made aware of the possibility that their implicit biases could be informing their treatment recommendations did not end up showing such a disparity in their treatment plans.

While all of the above-mentioned studies attempt to address the nonconscious process of implicit racism through conscious thought processes and self-awareness, others have sought to combat aversive racism through altering nonconscious processes. In the same way that implicit attitudes can be learned through sociocultural transmission, they can be "unlearned". By making individuals aware of the implicit biases affecting their behavior, they can take steps to control automatic negative associations that can lead to discriminatory behavior. A growing body of research has demonstrated that practice pairing minority racial out-groups with counter-stereotypic examples can reduce implicit forms of bias. Moskowitz, Salomon and Taylor found that people with egalitarian attitudes responded faster to egalitarian words after being shown an African-American face, relative to a white face. In later research, it was shown that when primed in such a way as to motivate egalitarian behaviors, stereotype-relevant reactions were slower, but notably, these reactions were recorded at speeds too fast to have been consciously controlled, indicating an implicit bias shift, rather than explicit.

One very interesting finding may have implied that aversive racism can be combated simply by eliminating the desire to employ the time- and energy-saving tactic of stereotyping. By priming and inducing participants' creativity, which causes people to avoid leaning on their energy-saving mental shortcuts, such as stereotyping, reduced participants' propensity to stereotype.

Finally, there is evidence to suggest that simply having a greater amount of intergroup contact is associated with less implicit intergroup bias.

== See also ==
- Ambivalent sexism
- Ambivalent prejudice
- Allosemitism
- Tokenism
- Stereotype threat
- White flight
