= Myths of romantic love =

False conceptions about the nature of love

Myths of romantic love are defined by Carlos Yela García, as a set of false conceptions that are broadly socially accepted about the nature of romantic love. These myths typically define romantic love as naturally including: soulmate status, exclusive loving, sexual fidelity, jealousy as love, a desire for marriage, eternal passion, falling in love is love's maximum, that "love conquers all", and monogamy is universal. Like all false conceptions they are believed to be impossible to perfectly fulfill, and they bring grief to those trying to attain them. These myths were originally proposed as a cause for gendered hegemony, in that believing in these conceptions about the nature of romantic love is tied to the subjugation of women. Research studies have concluded that belief in these myths is associated with greater acceptance for inter-partner abuse, as well as believing heterosexual monogamous romance is the social standard.

== Myths ==
There are nine myths proposed by Carlos Yela García that are socially accepted as natural qualities of romantic love:

- Myth of the better half: that the person one has chosen to couple with was predestined and was the only or best possible option.
- Myth of exclusiveness: a person can only feel love for one person at the same time.
- Myth of fidelity: passionate, romantic and erotic desires must be satisfied exclusively with one's partner.
- Myth of jealousy: jealousy is an indicator of true love.
- Myth of marriage: passionate love must lead to a stable cohabitation of the couple.
- Myth of eternal passion: passionate love in the first months of a relationship can and must go on forever.
- Myth of equivalence: the concepts of love and "falling in love" are equivalent, and therefore, if you stop "being in love", it means that you do not love your partner anymore.
- Myth of omnipotence: "love can do everything" and must remain no matter what happens in the relationship.
- Myth of couple: the monogamous couple is something natural and universal, and it has always been at any time and in any culture.

== Research ==
=== Abusive behavior ===
Various studies have been conducted that link beliefs in myths of romantic love to greater probability of cyber-control perpetration toward the partner in youths aged 18 to 30, and a higher degree of justifying intimate partner violence in adults.

Researchers publishing in the Journal of Interpersonal Violence developed an instrument to measure love myths. Revisions eventually led to a 10-item questionnaire, grouped in two factors: idealization and love–abuse. Reliability analyses indicated an adequate internal consistency, and correlations with dating violence and quality of relationship provided evidence on its concurrent validity according to the researchers.

Researchers publishing in the Journal of Adolescence studied 448 Spanish adolescents and told to complete the Perception of Abuse Scale and the Myths, Fallacies, and Misconceptions about Romantic Love Scale. Significant negative associations between the myths of romantic love and the perceived severity of abusive behaviors were found. Myths regarding possession, dedication, and exclusivity were associated with a lower perceived severity of abusive behaviors in adolescent males. Myths regarding the omnipotence of love were associated with a lower perceived severity of abusive behaviors in adolescent females.

Several Spanish researchers publishing in the International Journal of Environmental Research and Public Health surveyed Spanish adolescents and asked them to fill out a questionnaire that defined their attitudes regarding love and gender. The researchers concluded that participants that scored highly in either benevolent or hostile sexism were more likely to endorse love myths. Participants regardless of gender were also more likely to either exhibit controlling behavior or be the victim of controlling behavior online with partners.

=== Gender roles ===
Gender studies scholar Gabriella Cerretti proposes that the idealizations found in the myths of romantic love encourage women to ignore other life goals and aspirations for romance, and view romance as a place for personal dedication and a way to gain identity. Cerretti also proposes the myths promote men to view romance as a domain requiring their lone initiation and later full direction, while also subduing all emotional sensitivity.

Researcher Sánchez-Sicilia found in a study that monogamous people and people who had never had a romantic relationship were most likely to believe in myths of romantic love. Non-monogamous and/or bisexual people were less likely to endorse myths of romantic love compared to heterosexual and homosexual respondents.
