= Hostile prejudice =

Expression of hate for people's identity

Hostile prejudice is the outward expression of hate for people of a different race, religion, ideology, country, sex, sexual orientation, or gender identity. Anyone who goes against specific criteria of dress, cultural or moral beliefs, or religious or political ideologies are subject to hostile racism. This racism often leads to direct discrimination to anyone who does not fit the prejudiced person's idea of a "normal" person. This behavior is most prevalent when there are noticeable differences between ingroups and outgroups, with the outgroup members experiencing hostile prejudice from ingroup members.

== Research ==
Most research done on hostile prejudice has been done on hostile sexism. Peter Glick and Susan Fiske, along with several other colleagues, did a study on hostile and benevolent sexism across cultures. Glick and his colleagues found that hostile sexism and benevolent sexism are consistent notions that have a positive relationship to each other across nations. Women and men are viewed by hostile sexism as opposites in that women try to control men by domesticated means (e.g., marriage, demands for attention, and material possessions), forcing men to attempt to hang on to their independence and keep their masculinity. Glick and colleagues found that, if sexism in a culture is high overall, then women will tend to reject hostile sexism over benevolent sexism when it comes to men. They also found that, based on national averages on hostile sexism and benevolent sexism, predictions can be made regarding gender inequality across nations.

== See also ==
- Ambivalent prejudice
- Benevolent prejudice
- Conflict theories
- Hate crime
- Hate speech
- Prejudice
- Stereotype
