= Radical American Partisanship =

2022 non-fiction book about political violence

- Author: Lilliana Mason and Nathan Kalmoe
- Language: English
- Publisher: University of Chicago Press
- Publication date: May 2022
- Publication place: United States

Radical American Partisanship: Mapping Violent Hostility, Its Causes, and the Consequences for Democracy is a 2022 book by political scientists Lilliana Mason and Nathan Kalmoe. Radical American Partisanship analyzes political violence in America.

Kalmoe and Mason ask a variety of survey questions to determine American support for political violence, and in particular support for partisan political violence. Westwood et al. criticized some of these measures – which include questions like "How much do you feel it is justified for [respondent's own party] to use violence in advancing their political goals these days?" – as ambiguous and likely to overestimate American support for political violence.

Radical American Partisanship describes correlations between support for partisan political violence and other traits. For example, they find that ideological extremity is not associated with support for partisan political violence, but that aggressive interpersonal behavior is. One less-central finding of Radical American Partisanship is that people who show hostile sexism are more likely to support partisan political violence.
