= Ambivalent prejudice =

Social psychology theory

Ambivalent prejudice is a social psychological theory that states that, when people become aware that they have conflicting beliefs about an outgroup (a group of people that do not belong to an individual's own group), they experience an unpleasant mental feeling generally referred to as cognitive dissonance. These feelings are brought about because the individual on one hand believes in humanitarian virtues such as helping those in need, but on the other hand also believes in individualistic virtues such as working hard to improve one's life.

Bernard Whitley and Mary Kite contend that this dissonance motivates people to alter their thoughts in an attempt to reduce their discomfort. Depending on the situation or context that has primed them, people will give priority to either the positive beliefs or the negative beliefs, leading to a corresponding behavioral shift known as response amplification.

== Theoretical framework ==
According to Susan Fiske, there are two underlying characteristics of stigmatized groups around the world: the ideas that status predicts perceived competence and that cooperation predicts perceived warmth. Two combinations of competence and warmth produce ambivalent prejudices. The combined perception of groups as warm but incompetent leads to pitied groups, such as traditional women or older people. The combined perception of groups as competent but cold leads to envied groups, such as nontraditional women or minority entrepreneurs. Fiske uses this conception of prejudice to explain ambivalent sexism, heterosexism, racism, anti-immigrant biases, ageism, and classism.

== Views ==
According to Whitley and Kite, ambivalent prejudice comes from one person having both good and bad thoughts about an outgroup. The example in their book The Psychology of Prejudice and Discrimination talks about race and how some people often have ambivalent attitudes towards people of other races. This means that their behavior is also ambivalent: "sometimes it is positive, sometimes negative."

Irwin Katz said that ambivalent prejudice occurs when only the individual becomes aware of the conflicting attitudes, which can be caused for most people simply by coming face to face with someone from the outgroup. According to Katz, that conflict of attitudes can cause problems with one's self-image because it seems as if one is not living up to all important values that one holds. The conflict can cause negative emotions, which are expressed in negative behavior.

Irwin Katz and Glen Hass (1988) believed that contradicting American values are to blame for ambivalent prejudice. The first value is that hard work will always pay off and people get what they deserve, but the other value is that all people are equal and that people should help the less fortunate. When that is applied to race, many people are torn. They see disadvantaged people of other races as not working hard enough to be worth as much as people of their own race, but they also understand that people of other race have a harder time financially and socially. Those mixed emotions lead to ambivalence.

Tara MacDonald and Mark Zanna suggested that stereotypes were to blame for ambivalent prejudice. According to MacDonald and Zanna, people can like others and respect others, and both emotions work independently of each other. When a person feels those things towards an entire group, it is because of stereotypes. Therefore, a person can like and disrespect people of other races because of certain stereotypes, or they can dislike but respect the same group of people for other stereotypes.

In a study testing the nature of ambivalent prejudice, Hisako Matsuo and Kevin McIntyre (2005) studied American attitudes toward immigrant groups. He proposed that ambivalent prejudice stems from two views. There is the individualistic attitude that values the Protestant work ethic, an attitude that is associated with more negative attitudes toward outgroups. The other view is an egalitarian or humanitarian one, which is associated with more positive attitudes toward outgroups.

== Measures ==
Researchers use a variety of methods to measure ambivalent prejudice. The most widely used method is the Ambivalent Sexism Inventory (ASI), developed by Glick and Fiske in 1996. The ASI focuses on sexism, a form of ambivalent prejudice characterized by both hostile and benevolent attitudes toward women. These attitudes reflect typical ingroup-outgroup dynamics, where men, as the higher-status group, exhibit ambivalence rooted in three sources—paternalism, gender differentiation, and heterosexuality—principles measured by the Ambivalent Sexism Inventory.

Hostile sexism targets women who resist traditional gender roles, resembling overly negative, old-fashioned sexism. The theory identifies resentment toward nontraditional women along each dimension: dominative paternalism, competitive gender differentiation, and heterosexual hostility. Conversely, women who co-operate with traditional gender roles and relationships evoke benevolent sexism, characterized by attitudes like protective paternalism, complementary gender differentiation, and heterosexual intimacy. The ASI measures sexism along all of the six dimensions that compose hostile sexism and benevolent sexism.

The ASI is a self-report measure consisting of 22 items, evenly divided between hostile sexism and benevolent sexism subscales (11 each). Participants rate their agreement to the statements on a 6-point Likert scale, where 0 indicates strong disagreement and 5 indicates strong agreement. Certain items are reversed coded so that agreement with the statement indicates lower levels of sexism and disagreement with the statement indicates higher levels of sexism. Both subscales can be either calculated separately or averaged together to get an overall measure of sexism.

Example items from the ASI include:

(Below is a series of statements concerning men and women and their relationships in contemporary society that this study wrote for their subjects to evaluate.)

Benevolent sexism subset:

- People are often truly happy in life without being romantically involved with a member of the other sex.
- No matter how accomplished he is, a man is not truly complete as a person unless he has the love of a woman.
- Men are complete without women.
- Every man ought to have a woman whom he adores.
- Women should be cherished and protected by men.
- Women, as compared to men, tend to have a more refined sense of culture and good taste.
- Women, compared to men, tend to have superior moral sensibility.
- Many women have a quality of purity that few men possess.

Hostile sexism subset:

- Women exaggerate problems they have at work.
- Most women interpret innocent remarks or acts as being sexist.
- Women are too easily offended.
- Most women fail to fully appreciate all that men do for them.
- Feminists are not seeking for women to have more power than men.
- There are actually very few women who get a kick out of teasing men by seeming sexually available and then refusing male advances.

Researchers use various other methods to measure different types of ambivalent prejudices. For example, the Modern Racism Scale measures aspects of ambivalent racism.

The Modern Racism Scale, developed by McConahay in 1986, is another tool for assessing subtle and ambivalent racial prejudice. It evaluates attitudes such as the denial of systemic discrimination, resentment over perceived favoritism toward racial minorities, and a tendency to blame disadvantaged groups for their circumstances. By probing these ambivalent attitudes, the MRS reveals a duality in perceptions: individuals may outwardly support equality while simultaneously resisting measures aimed at addressing racial inequality.

The MRS employs statements like "Discrimination against [outgroup] is no longer a problem in today’s society" and "Over the past few years, [outgroup] has been getting more than they deserve." Participants rate their agreement for these statements on a Likert scale, allowing researchers to measure subtle forms of bias that align with modern social norms. While the MRS has been widely used in studies of policy attitudes and contextual influences on prejudice, it is not without limitations. Other researchers point out its vulnerability to social desirability bias, where respondents may underreport negative attitudes, and its cultural specificity, which requires careful adaptation for use outside the United States.

Beyond the Modern Racism Scale, researchers have developed additional tools to study ambivalent prejudice in other contexts, such as gender, immigration, and intergroup dynamics. The Humanitarianism-Protestant Work Ethic Scale (HPWES), developed by Katz and Hass in 1988, assesses the conflict between humanitarian values, such as empathy and support for helping disadvantaged groups, and individualistic values that emphasize self-reliance and hard work. This scale has been specifically useful in studying attitudes toward immigrants and refugees—groups often viewed ambivalently as deserving of compassion but also perceived as burdensome to societal resources. Research using this scale has shown that these conflicting values drive much of the ambivalence toward marginalized groups.

Implicit measures, like the Implicit Association Test (IAT), can also prove useful by uncovering unconscious or automatic biases. Unlike explicit self-report tools, the IAT is said to assess how individuals may unconsciously associate social groups with both positive and negative attributes. For example, an individual might implicitly link an outgroup with warmth while simultaneously associating it with incompetence, showing the two sides of ambivalence. Similarly, affective priming tasks examine how exposure to stereotypes or group-related stimuli influences immediate, subconscious reactions.

Behavioral studies also provide insight on ambivalence, particularly through the concept of response amplification. This phenomenon occurs when individuals exhibit exaggerated reactions—either overly positive or negative—toward members of a stigmatized group. For instance, research has shown that ambivalent individuals often overcompensate with excessive praise or criticism depending on situational cues. Physiological measures like skin conductance and heart rate variability capture emotional reactions during interactions with outgroup members. In addition to behavioral studies, recent advances in neuroscience have further expanded the understanding of ambivalent prejudice. Functional MRI (fMRI) studies have identified brain regions involved in processing conflicting attitudes, such as the anterior cingulate cortex (ACC) and prefrontal cortex, which are activated during cognitive dissonance, therefore bringing attention to the fluctuating behaviors and attitudes characteristic of ambivalent prejudice.

== Applications ==
=== Sexism ===
First introduced by Glick and Fiske (1996), Ambivalent Sexism theory encapsulates two differing ideologies, hostile and benevolent sexism, that explain the persistent discriminatory attitudes towards women in accordance with the stereotype content model. Hostile sexism is expressed when women choose to differ from the traditional, normative standard ascribed to their gender role. These women tend to be regarded as low in warmth, yet demand high competence. Examples of such include women who are CEOs, politicians or those with high achievements and awards. The typical attitude exhibited towards these women will be expressed as resentment, which may manifest in explicit discriminatory behaviour attacking their profession or new role. In comparison, benevolent sexism is expressed towards women who follow the traditional gender role, yet are subtly discriminated against due to their chosen societal role. These women tend to be regarded as high in warmth, yet low in competence. Examples of such include women who are stay-at-home mothers. The typical attitude exhibited towards these women will be expressed through cherishment and protection, often implicitly discriminating against women by believing them to be incapable of caring for themselves without the male status quo.

Fiske posits that the two forms of sexism posited in Ambivalent Sexism theory work to reinforce the male hierarchical power by reducing women to whether or not they follow the traditional roles. Hostile sexism is more explicit and derogatory in its exhibition, often believing that these women are outliers to the social norms. Benevolent sexism is expressed more implicitly, often seeing women as objects to be protected and requiring a traditional male figure to guide and nourish them. These behaviours may be subconsciously expressed, with some people not believing it to be inherently discriminatory. However, the assumption that women are incapable and require unsolicited advice or guidance is a form of benevolent sexism that can be expressed towards women who are perceived to follow prescribed gender roles.

One of the consequences of widespread ambivalent sexism is violence. In a systematic literature review by Bareket and Fiske (2023), hostile sexism leads to more direct violence, which tends to be expressed in relation to the status quo being threatened by women power. In comparison, benevolent sexism leads to expressions that justify the discriminatory behaviour. Bareket and Fiske label this as indirect violence, leading to cases of victim blaming passive facilitation of the discriminatory behavior and/or inaction towards discriminatory behaviour. These expressions of prejudice have been found to be expressed within a public domain, such as in a workplace, or within one’s private space.

=== Racism ===
Ambivalent racism depicts two contrasting reactions by whites toward blacks. These competing evaluations include hostile (antiblack) sentiments and subjectively sympathetic but paternalistic (problack) sentiments. Problack attitudes attribute black disadvantage to larger social structures and factors including discrimination, segregation, and lack of opportunities. In contrast, hostile antiblack racism, like old-fashioned racism asserts that "black people are unambitious, disorganized, free-riding, and do not value education." Fiske states that "black Americans are viewed ambivalently mainly to the extent that white Americans simultaneously harbor a more subjectively positive and a more hostile attitude, which can flip from one polarity to the other, depending on individual differences in beliefs and on situational cues."

=== Ableism ===
Söder suggests that people do not have fixed cognitive assumptions or emotions about people with disabilities. Rather, people are ambivalent, so their behavior in any given situation will depend on the context. People have two contrasting ideas about people with disabilities; people devalue disabilities while maintaining a benevolent sympathy towards disabled people. This leads to a conflict between basic values held by wider society and moral dilemmas in concrete daily interactions with people with disabilities. Söder proposes an ambivalence model as a better method for evaluating interactions with and attitudes about disabled people as it better captures the totality of people's sentiments.

=== Xenophobia ===
Matsuo and McIntyre applied the concept of ambivalent prejudice to immigrants and refugees. They described attitudes toward immigrants and refugees as ambivalent since on the one hand they are perceived "sympathetically, as disadvantaged, and deserving of justice", but on the other hand, they are seen as "more likely to be involved in crime and a burden on the public system." Matsuo and McIntyre used a sample survey of college students to test egalitarianism and the Protestant work ethic (PWE) and how it relates to perceptions of refugees. Participants completed survey questions regarding social contact, attitudes toward specific ethnic groups, general attitudes toward refugees, and the Humanitarianism/Protestant Work Ethic Scale. They found that the ambivalent attitudes toward refugees is based on the "dual maintenance of American values", egalitarianism and PWE. In testing the contact theory, they found that only when contact is personal and cooperative does prejudice decrease.

== Response amplification ==
Response amplification is a strategy that may be used to lessen the negative effects of cognitive dissonance that arises from conflicting beliefs one may hold towards their out-groups. Response amplification is defined by engaging in a more extreme, overdone response towards stigmatized out-group members, in comparison to non-stigmatized individuals. Exaggerated responses are overly positive or negative, relative to what is typically expected of the situation. Bell and Esses (2002) from the University of Western University explain that this occurs from a motivation to reduce ambivalence, as doing so amplifies one side of the individual’s conflicting opinion, thereby mitigating the difference in beliefs.

For example, a white person holding a stigmatized view of black people may evaluate this group more positively or negatively than they would for a white person, or non-stigmatized group. This was explored in the 1991 study by Hass et al. from the City University of New York. The researchers assessed the level of ambivalence in a sample of white students. Participants were then partnered with a Black or White teammate, and were instructed to complete a task together. As part of the study, the assigned teammate was instructed to intentionally cause the failure or successful achievement of the task by the researchers. Following task completion, the participants rated their teammate’s performance. Results demonstrated that those who scored higher in ambivalence tended to rate the black teammate more positively in the success condition, but more negatively in the failure condition compared to the ratings that were given to the white teammates in either condition. The findings demonstrate an amplified response towards one group to be correlated with incidence of ambivalence.

Response amplification has been found in multiple contexts. Besides racial (as previously indicated), the over-exaggerated responses have also been observed in interactions between able-bodied people towards disabled individuals, men rating women (and vice versa), and in ratings towards female feminists.

== Mitigation ==
Leippe and Eisenstadt found that dissonance mediated change may be more successful when an internal conflict already exists, that is, when individuals possess cognitive dissonance that can be a result of ambivalence. In three experiments, whites were encouraged to write essays regarding scholarship policies that would favor blacks. Writing the essay led to a more positive perception of the policy, as well as, in some cases, more positive attitudes towards blacks in general. Ambivalent people were more likely to comply with writing a positive essay than non ambivalent people. As a result of writing the essay, participants felt cognitive dissonance which led them to engage in a sort of cognitive restructuring to further reduce the dissonance. This meant engaging in more extended thinking that led to more positive beliefs about Blacks in general as well as about the specific policy. By inducing compliance in writing, they were able to induce a change in attitudes toward the target group.

Fiske suggests several methods to mitigate ambivalent prejudice particularly in the context of business management. These methods mainly involve an increased awareness and recognition of the different types of prejudice. She states that not all prejudices are alike, but they do create predictable groups of stereotypes, emotional prejudices, and discriminatory tendencies. When working to counteract prejudice, the focus should be on the most stereotypically negative aspect for a group, for example, competence for older people. In addition, constructive contact, that involving cooperation and equal status in the setting, for example, between groups improves emotional intelligence.

== See also ==
- Benevolent prejudice
- Hostile prejudice
- Ingroups and outgroups
- Role congruity theory
- Women are wonderful
- Aversive racism
- Tokenism
- Allosemitism
