= Pseudospeciation =

Pseudospeciation is a form of othering, the treatment of different human groups as if they were different biological species. It begins with the fact that cultural differences cause humans to separate into different social groups, with different language, dress, customs, etc. These cultural differences are claimed to be analogous to the formation of different biological species (speciation). In the extreme, pseudospeciation leads to dehumanization of other cultural groups (out-groups).

Pseudospeciation, according to the Oxford English Dictionary, refers to the tendency of members of in-groups to consider members of out-groups to have evolved genetically into different, separate, and inferior species to their own. The term was first used by Erik Erikson in 1966, according to his biographer, Lawrence J. Friedman. Dehumanization is one possible outcome of pseudospeciation, as is ethnic discrimination or genocide.

Francisco Gil-White proposed in 2001 that humans evolved in such a way that the brain perceives different ethnic groups to be equivalent to different biological 'species', thus suggesting that pseudospeciation is innate. His hypothesis has yet to receive widespread empirical support. His theory and data are found in Current Anthropology, Vol. 42, No. 4, pp. 515–554. Pseudospeciation is an especially virulent form of ethnocentrism. Karl Marlantes, in his book What It Is Like to Go to War (Grove Press, 2011), referred to pseudospeciation by American soldiers in World War II and in the Vietnam War as a coping mechanism for dealing with Japanese and Vietnamese soldiers differently from European (Germans and Italians for instance) soldiers in those wars. Since an underlying precept of pseudospeciation is the dehumanization of the enemy, it helps the soldiers rationalize barbaric or socially unacceptable behavior visited upon soldiers of a race and culture visually and contextually different from their own. One example Marlantes posits is the treatment of prisoners, or what might be characterized as the murder of soldiers attempting to surrender.

== See also ==
- Ecotype
- Ecophenotypic variation
- Polymorphism
