= Counterstereotype =

Reverse of a stereotype

A counterstereotype is an idea or object that goes against a stereotype—a standardized mental picture that is held in common by members of a group and that represents an oversimplified opinion, prejudiced attitude, or uncritical judgment.

== Process ==
=== Background ===
Minority groups within society are often portrayed negatively within popular media. Through psychological processes such as priming, this reinforces consumers' negative stereotypes toward those groups. Bombarding consumers with these stereotypes causes implicit attitudes - which occurs in the absence of conscious thought - to be negative towards those groups. This has a wide range of consequences, with the most profound effects being seen in exposure to the "negative" group in ambiguous situations. An example of this can be seen with the over-portrayal of African-Americans as criminals in American media: the psychological literature shows that through media reinforcement of a criminal stereotype, consumers of this content evaluate African-Americans as more dangerous than other groups even in ambiguous situations. This demonstrates how media depiction of stereotypes can lead directly to prejudice. This is consequential because it can affect not only inter-group interactions, but the self-identity of the "negative group" (see: Self-fulfilling prophecy). Psychological research has shown that the stereotype associated simply with one's name can cause changes in behavior and cognition.

Counter-stereotypes work by presenting media consumers with a member of a "negative" group who does not act stereotypically. This challenges consumers' existing attitudes towards that group, and has been shown to reduce existing prejudices toward them. Exposing consumers to counter-stereotypes may also lead to increased support for policy options aimed at addressing racial disparities, such as affirmative action.

=== Exemplar models ===
Exemplar-based explanations of counter-stereotyping have gained much support from the psychological literature. Prototypes can best be described as ideas of what a category is, formed by averaging all instances of that category that an individual has come into contact with. Exemplars are specific representations of that "averaged" category, and can serve to change the prototype. By presenting consumers with prototypes not consistent with their existing representation of that group, counter stereotypes can change implicit attitudes toward the target group. The recency and frequency of exposure to the exemplar mediate how stereotypes change over time, with those that are chronically accessible being the most effective of all.

=== Categorization-Processing-Adaptation-Generalization model ===
The Categorization Processing Adaptation Generalization model builds upon previous cognitive research as to how diversity experiences, or in essence counterstereotypical experiences can change the way people think. When encountering counter stereotypical events, if a perceiver is motivated to engage in elaborative processing involving stereotype suppression and generative thought, that with multiple experiences resulting in elaborative processing, the perceiver will develop generalized cognitive flexibility. This would mean the use of elaborative thought over heuristics based thinking, and weakens reliance on quick mental representations such as stereotypes.

== Applications ==
Stereotypes play a major role in daily life, and can affect one's judgement and behaviour without conscious awareness. Once stereotypes are established, they can be difficult to change, as the brain will fit information per an existing stereotype. This can manifest by changes in perception of skin tone or facial emotion expression. A lot of the misattribution is due to the lack of accurate information. This can arise from not receiving proper education on a subject or failures in memory. When there are gaps in knowledge, the brain uses stereotypes and biases to fill in the gaps, especially if these implicit biases are accessible. Counterstereotypes can play a role in updating memories that form these biases. By presenting counter-examples, people can reappraise their views as well as reconsolidate the memory traces related to the pre-existing stereotypes.

Countersterotypes have been applied in research as an intervention to change implicit biases. It has been shown that simply negating a stereotype does not reduce implicit biases. By presenting counterstereotypical exemplars, some research has found a short-term reduction in stereotypes. It was successful in reducing bias by linking in-group members with negativity and out-group members with positivity, or by presenting counterstereotypical exemplars that participants strongly identified with. Interactions with a stereotyped out-group aid individuals in forming their own counterstereotypical exemplars. By forming positive relationships with out-group members, individuals form positive attitudes towards them and reduce implicit biases previously formed by stereotypes.

These techniques have been applied to many different stereotypes. In the medical field, researchers focus on reducing implicit biases. Many biases come in conflict of quality of care, with people of a certain age, weight, gender, race, and socio-economic status receiving lower quality of care. Interventions have not been useful in reducing healthcare students' implicit weight bias. In educational settings, counterstereotype interventions have been used to counteract the effects of gender stereotypes. Math performance by women improved when the test administrators were women competent in math, and more female students enrol in STEM subjects when female role models are presented.

Besides counterstereotypic exemplars, other interventions to implicit biases are often examined, such as perspective-taking, stereotype replacement, individuating, and evaluative conditioning.

== Limitations ==
=== Selection bias ===
One major limitation of the Counterstereotype effect is that it may not reach the audience which would benefit most from exposure because that audience chooses not to view content with minority characters. In the last few decades, the ability for audiences to be selective with their choice for media consumption has increased rapidly and led to the rise of the echo chamber. Individuals who hold an explicit negative stereotype of a certain group have the option to avoid all content which contains that group, preventing exposure to the counter-stereotype altogether. Research into this phenomenon also suggests that negative stereotypes don't have to be held explicitly to affect media viewing habits: implicit attitudes, which are not held consciously, affect the willingness of individuals to consume content depicting certain groups. In short, the counter-stereotype effect is limited not by the process in which it occurs, but by its limited ability to reach individuals who already hold negative attitudes towards the target group.

=== Backlash effects ===
Not to be confused with the boomerang effect which refers to unintended psychosocial consequences resulting from persuasion, nor backlash effects in sociology, the backlash effect is similar in principle, having to do with psychosocial consequences resulting from perception of being counter stereotypical. Most cited definition of the backlash effect by Rudman in 1998 is where violation of stereotypes may potentially lead to social or economic consequences. Although these counterstereotypical people may be perceived as unique, the backlash effect and its consequences often limit their success, and can lead to a reinforcement of stereotypes.

A 2004 study by Rudman and Fairchild modeled the backlash effect and stereotype maintenance stemming from perceivers and actors, their justification or fear of backlash, and the importance in the maintenance of self-esteem. From the perceivers view, if it is justified by a threat to their self-esteem, backlash towards counter stereotypical people may restore their sense of worth, however this only further reinforces societal stereotypes. The backlash effect can also lead counter stereotypical individuals to fear the potential consequences and thus be more likely to hide their counter stereotypical behavior, maintaining their self-esteem. This also leads to the maintenance of cultural stereotypes.

==== Examples of backlash effects ====
- Women being underrepresented in high level roles in some industries resulting from withholding promotions to women who display counter stereotypical behaviour, or women not wanting to exhibit counter stereotypical behaviour as a fear of backlash.
- The marvel character Miles Morales whom is a version of Spiderman that is often the white Peter Parker as had several waves of backlash directed at the character and creators
- Minority actors in Hollywood despite showing great talent, being typecast in cheap caricature roles, and backlash towards their success in the industry as a whole

== Notable examples ==
- An example of a counter-stereotype is the Fifteenth Doctor, a character in the British TV series Dr. Who. Previously played full-time exclusively by white actors, the inclusion of a black actor for this role served to combat existing stereotypes in British society.
- In the film Slumdog Millionaire, the main character displays exceptional intellectual abilities and wins a large monetary prize. This challenges the stereotype that those living in poverty are not intelligent.
- American popular literature in the 19th century contained stereotypical images of black people as grotesque and servile. In protest, a counter-stereotype arose which showed black people as graceful and wise.
- In the United States during the 1970s, in response to feminist criticism, advertising agencies chose to display counter-stereotypical images of women as sexually assertive and intellectual.
- In the film Legally Blonde, the main character, Elle Woods, acts as a counter-stereotype displaying how a blonde, conventionally attractive and fashion-loving woman is also intelligent and successful at attending law school.

== See also ==
- Affirmative action
- Benevolent prejudice
- Overcompensation
- Political correctness
- Reverse discrimination
- Women are wonderful
- Xenocentrism
