= Prejudice =

Attitudes based on preconceived categories

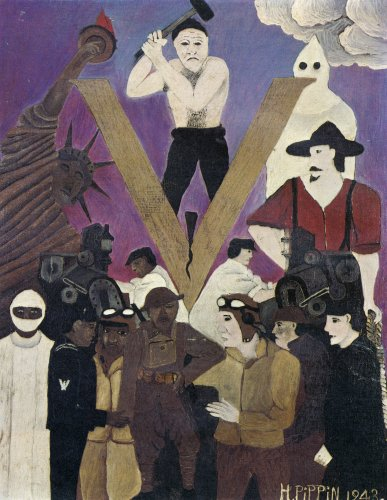
Mr. Prejudice, painted by Horace Pippin in 1943, depicts a personal view of race relations in the United States.

Prejudice can be an affective feeling towards a person based on their perceived social group membership. The word is often used to refer to a preconceived (usually unfavourable) evaluation or classification of another person based on that person's perceived personal characteristics, such as sex, gender, gender identity, beliefs, values, social class, friendship, age, disability, religion, sexuality, race, ethnicity, language, nationality, culture, complexion, beauty, height, body weight, occupation, wealth, education, criminality, sport-team affiliation, fandom, music tastes, enthusiasm or other perceived characteristics.

The word "prejudice" can also refer to unfounded or pigeonholed beliefs and it may apply to "any unreasonable attitude that is unusually resistant to rational influence". Gordon Allport defined prejudice as a "feeling, favorable or unfavorable, toward a person or thing, prior to, or not based on, actual experience". Auestad (2015) defines prejudice as characterized by "symbolic transfer", transfer of a value-laden meaning content onto a socially-formed category and then on to individuals who are taken to belong to that category, resistance to change, and overgeneralization.

According to American Psychological Association (APA), Implicit Association test (IAT) is an evaluation of certain negative attitudes towards people which are usually hidden or "Implicit". It measures how much a person is prone to discriminate against a certain group of people unconsciously. In 2023 alone, more than 40 million IATs were completed by people at the Project Implicit website, which means it is the most comprehensive scales to assess hidden biases among people

The United Nations Institute on Globalization, Culture and Mobility has highlighted research considering prejudice as a global security threat due to its use in scapegoating some populations and inciting others to commit violent acts towards them and how this can endanger individuals, countries, and the international community.

== Etymology ==
The word prejudice has been used since Middle English around the year 1300. It comes from the Old French word préjudice, which comes from Latin praeiūdicium which comes from prae (before) and iūdicium (judgment). The French word Prejuice actually means prejudgment or damage where as the Latin word Praeiudicium has several meanings like prior judgement, Judicial examination before trial or Harm. In Latin "Prae" means "Pre" and "iudicium" means "judgement".

== Historical approaches ==
The first psychological research conducted on prejudice occurred in the 1920s. This research attempted to prove white supremacy. One article from 1925 which reviewed 73 studies on race concluded that the studies seemed "to indicate the mental superiority of the white race". These studies, along with other research, led many psychologists to view prejudice as a natural response to races believed to be inferior.

In the 1930s and 1940s, this perspective began to change due to the increasing concern about anti-Semitism due to the ideology of the Nazis. At the time, theorists viewed prejudice as pathological and they thus looked for personality syndromes linked with racism. Theodor Adorno believed that prejudice stemmed from an authoritarian personality; he believed that people with authoritarian personalities were the most likely to be prejudiced against groups of lower status. He described authoritarians as "rigid thinkers who obeyed authority, saw the world as black and white, and enforced strict adherence to social rules and hierarchies".

In 1954, Gordon Allport, in his classic work The Nature of Prejudice, linked prejudice to categorical thinking. Allport claimed that prejudice is a natural and normal process for humans. According to him, "The human mind must think with the aid of categories... Once formed, categories are the basis for normal prejudgment. We cannot possibly avoid this process. Orderly living depends upon it." In his book, he emphasizes the importance of the contact hypothesis. This theory posits that contact between different (ethnic) groups can reduce prejudices against those groups. Allport acknowledges the importance of the circumstances in which such contact occurs. He has attached conditions to it to promote positive contact and reduce prejudices.

In the 1970s, research began to show that prejudice tends to be based on favoritism towards one's own groups, rather than negative feelings towards another group. According to Marilyn Brewer, prejudice "may develop not because outgroups are hated, but because positive emotions such as admiration, sympathy, and trust are reserved for the ingroup".

In 1979, Thomas Pettigrew described the ultimate attribution error and its role in prejudice. The ultimate attribution error occurs when ingroup members "(1) attribute negative outgroup behavior to dispositional causes (more than they would for identical ingroup behavior), and (2) attribute positive outgroup behavior to one or more of the following causes: (a) a fluke or exceptional case, (b) luck or special advantage, (c) high motivation and effort, and (d) situational factors"/

Young-Bruehl (1996) argued that prejudice cannot be treated in the singular; one should rather speak of different prejudices as characteristic of different character types. Her theory defines prejudices as being social defences, distinguishing between an obsessional character structure, primarily linked with anti-semitism, hysterical characters, primarily associated with racism, and narcissistic characters, linked with sexism.

== Contemporary theories and empirical findings ==
The out-group homogeneity effect is the perception that members of an out-group are more similar (homogenous) than members of the in-group. Social psychologists Quattrone and Jones conducted a study demonstrating this with students from the rival schools Princeton University and Rutgers University. Students at each school were shown videos of other students from each school choosing a type of music to listen to for an auditory perception study. Then the participants were asked to guess what percentage of the videotaped students' classmates would choose the same. Participants predicted a much greater similarity between out-group members (the rival school) than between members of their in-group.

The justification-suppression model of prejudice was created by Christian Crandall and Amy Eshleman. This model explains that people face a conflict between the desire to express prejudice and the desire to maintain a positive self-concept. This conflict causes people to search for justification for disliking an out-group, and to use that justification to avoid negative feelings (cognitive dissonance) about themselves when they act on their dislike of the out-group.

The realistic conflict theory states that competition between limited resources leads to increased negative prejudices and discrimination. This can be seen even when the resource is insignificant. In the Robber's Cave experiment, negative prejudice and hostility was created between two summer camps after sports competitions for small prizes. The hostility was lessened after the two competing camps were forced to cooperate on tasks to achieve a common goal.

Another contemporary theory is the integrated threat theory (ITT), which was developed by Walter G Stephan. It draws from and builds upon several other psychological explanations of prejudice and ingroup/outgroup behaviour, such as the realistic conflict theory and symbolic racism. It also uses the social identity theory perspective as the basis for its validity; that is, it assumes that individuals operate in a group-based context where group memberships form a part of individual identity. ITT posits that outgroup prejudice and discrimination is caused when individuals perceive an outgroup to be threatening in some way. ITT defines four threats:

- Realistic threats
- Symbolic threats
- Intergroup anxiety
- Negative stereotypes

Realistic threats are tangible, such as competition for a natural resource or a threat to income. Symbolic threats arise from a perceived difference in cultural values between groups or a perceived imbalance of power (for example, an ingroup perceiving an outgroup's religion as incompatible with theirs). Intergroup anxiety is a feeling of uneasiness experienced in the presence of an outgroup or outgroup member, which constitutes a threat because interactions with other groups cause negative feelings (e.g., a threat to comfortable interactions). Negative stereotypes are similarly threats, in that individuals anticipate negative behaviour from outgroup members in line with the perceived stereotype (for example, that the outgroup is violent). Often these stereotypes are associated with emotions such as fear and anger. ITT differs from other threat theories by including intergroup anxiety and negative stereotypes as threat types.

Additionally, social dominance theory states that society can be viewed as group-based hierarchies. In competition for scarce resources such as housing or employment, dominant groups create prejudiced "legitimizing myths" to provide moral and intellectual justification for their dominant position over other groups and validate their claim over the limited resources. Legitimizing myths, such as discriminatory hiring practices or biased merit norms, work to maintain these prejudiced hierarchies.

Prejudice can be a central contributing factor to depression. This can occur in someone who is a prejudice victim, being the target of someone else's prejudice, or when people have prejudice against themselves that causes their own depression.

Paul Bloom argues that while prejudice can be irrational and have terrible consequences, it is natural and often quite rational. This is because prejudices are based on the human tendency to categorise objects and people based on prior experience. This means people make predictions about things in a category based on prior experience with that category, with the resulting predictions usually being accurate (though not always). Bloom argues that this process of categorisation and prediction is necessary for survival and normal interaction, quoting William Hazlitt, who stated "Without the aid of prejudice and custom, I should not be able to find my way my across the room; nor know how to conduct myself in any circumstances, nor what to feel in any relation of life".

In recent years, researchers have argued that the study of prejudice has been traditionally too narrow. It is argued that since prejudice is defined as a negative affect towards members of a group, there are many groups against whom prejudice is acceptable (such as rapists, men who abandon their families, pedophiles, neo-Nazis, drink-drivers, queue jumpers, murderers etc.), yet such prejudices are not studied. It has been suggested that researchers have focused too much on an evaluative approach to prejudice, rather than a descriptive approach, which looks at the actual psychological mechanisms behind prejudiced attitudes. It is argued that this limits research to targets of prejudice to groups deemed to be receiving unjust treatment, while groups researchers deem treated justly or deservedly of prejudice are overlooked. As a result, the scope of prejudice has begun to expand in research, allowing a more accurate analysis of the relationship between psychological traits and prejudice.

Some researchers had advocated looking into understanding prejudice from the perspective of collective values than just as biased psychological mechanism and different conceptions of prejudice, including what lay people think constitutes prejudice. This is due to concerns that the way prejudice has been operationalised does not fit its psychological definition and that it is often used to indicate a belief is faulty or unjustified without actually proving this to be the case.

Some research has connected dark triad personality traits (Machiavellianism, grandiose narcissism, and psychopathy) with being more likely to hold racist, sexist, xenophobic, homophobic, and transphobic views.

=== Evolutionary psychology ===
Some evolutionary theorists consider prejudice as having functional utility in evolutionary process. A number of evolutionary psychologists in particular posit that human psychology, including emotion and cognition, is influenced by evolutionary processes. These theorists argue that although psychological variation appears between individuals, the majority of our psychological mechanisms are adapted specifically to solve recurrent problems in our evolutionary history, including social problems.

For example, James J. Gibson, a founder of ecological psychology, believes that human evolutionary success is enhanced by the ability to analyze social costs and benefits so that humans can recognize and functionally respond to threats and opportunities, and that errors in judgment will be biased toward minimizing costs to reproductive fitness. In other words, human responses to social stimuli proceed from adaptations that motivate action in order to take advantage of opportunities and avoid or confront threats. Some proponents of this perspective believe that these responses can be measured by implicit association tests.

Unconscious negative reactions are often referred to as prejudice, but prejudices are more contextually rich than simple reactions, which may involve discrete emotions in an evolutionary perspective. In this perspective, evolved biases may have implications for both beneficial or harmful expressions of stigma, prejudice, or discriminatory behavior in post-industrial societies. Some common biases include those related to sex, age, and race.

=== Problems with psychological models ===
One problem with the notion that prejudice evolved because of a necessity to simplify social classifications because of limited brain capacity and at the same time can be mitigated through education is that the two contradict each other, the combination amounting to saying that the problem is a shortage of hardware and at the same time can be mitigated by stuffing even more software into the hardware one just said was overloaded with too much software. The distinction between men's hostility to outgroup men being based on dominance and aggression and women's hostility to outgroup men being based on fear of sexual coercion is criticized with reference to the historical example that Hitler and other male Nazis believed that intergroup sex was worse than murder and would destroy them permanently which they did not believe that war itself would, i.e. a view of outgroup male threat that evolutionary psychology considers to be a female view and not a male view.

== Types of prejudice ==
One can be prejudiced against or have a preconceived notion about someone due to any characteristic they find to be unusual or undesirable. A few commonplace examples of prejudice are those based on someone's race, gender, nationality, social status, sexual orientation, or religious affiliation, and controversies may arise from any given topic.

=== Gender identity ===
Transgender and non-binary people can be discriminated against because they identify with a gender that does not align with their assigned sex at birth. Refusal to call them by their preferred pronouns, or claims that they are not the gender they identify as, could be considered discrimination, especially if the victim of this discrimination has expressed repetitively what their preferred identity is.

Gender identity is now considered a protected category of discrimination. Therefore, severe cases of this discrimination can lead to criminal penalty or prosecution in some countries, and workplaces are required (in some jurisdictions) to protect against discrimination based on gender identity.

==== Sexism ====
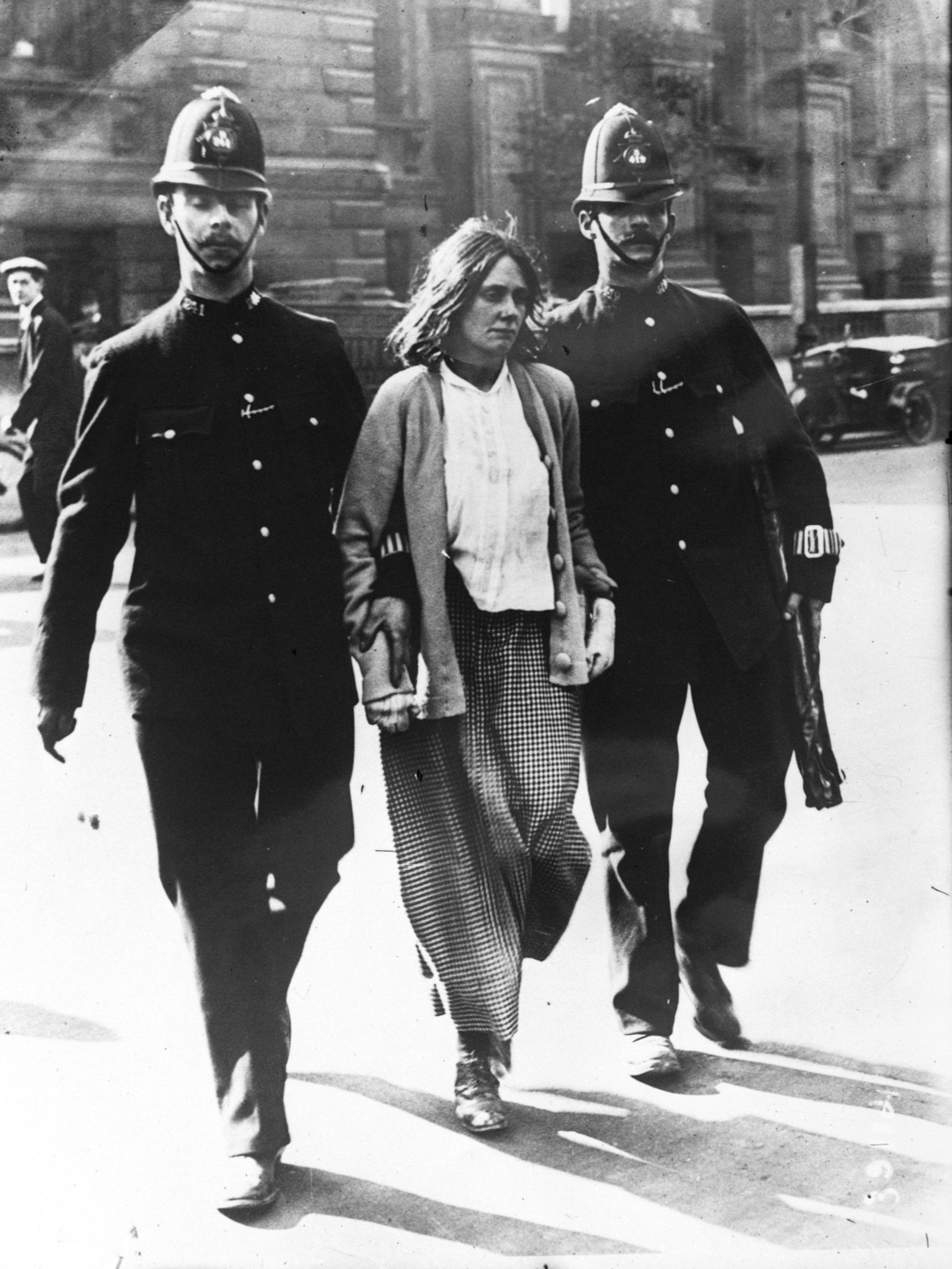
Suffragette Dora Thewlis was arrested by the Metropolitan Police in 1914 for campaigning for women's right to vote.

Sexism is prejudice or discrimination based on one's sex or gender. Sexism can affect anyone, but primarily affects women and girls. It has been linked to gender roles and stereotypes, and may include the belief that one sex or gender is intrinsically superior to another. Extreme sexism may foster sexual harassment, rape, and other forms of sexual violence. Discrimination in this context is defined as discrimination toward people based on their gender identity or their gender or sex differences. Sexism refers to violation of equal opportunities (formal equality) based on gender or refers to violation of equality of outcomes based on gender, also called substantive equality. Sexism may arise from social or cultural customs and norms.

=== Nationalism ===
Nationalism is a sentiment based on common cultural characteristics that binds a population and often produces a policy of national independence or separatism. It suggests a "shared identity" amongst a nation's people that minimizes differences within the group and emphasizes perceived boundaries between the group and non-members. This leads to the assumption that members of the nation have more in common than they actually do, that they are "culturally unified", even if injustices within the nation based on differences like status and race exist. During times of conflict between one nation and another, nationalism is controversial since it may function as a buffer for criticism when it comes to the nation's own problems since it makes the nation's own hierarchies and internal conflicts appear to be natural. It may also serve a way of rallying the people of the nation in support of a particular political goal. Nationalism usually involves a push for conformity, obedience, and solidarity amongst the nation's people and can result not only in feelings of public responsibility but also in a narrow sense of community due to the exclusion of those who are considered outsiders. Since the identity of nationalists is linked to their allegiance to the state, the presence of strangers who do not share this allegiance may result in hostility.

=== Classism ===
Classism is defined by Dictionary.com as "a biased or discriminatory attitude on distinctions made between social or economic classes".

Some argue that economic inequality is an unavoidable aspect of society and the inequality of abilities, so there will always be a ruling class. Some also argue that, even within the most egalitarian societies in history, some form of ranking based on worth-based and worth-based individual status takes place. Therefore, one may believe the existence of social classes is a natural feature of society. Hierarchies can also be found in animals such as apes and other primates.

Others argue the contrary. According to anthropological evidence, for the majority of the time the human species has been in existence, humans have lived in a manner in which the land and resources were not privately owned, although were common merely among the members of the same kin-based band or tribe. Also, since it was kin-oriented, when social ranking did occur, it was not antagonistic or hostile like the current class system.

=== Sexual discrimination ===
Individuals with non-heterosexual sexual attraction, such as homosexuals and bisexuals, may experience hatred from others due to their sexual orientation; a term for such hatred based upon one's sexual orientation is homophobia. However, more specific words for discrimination directed towards specific sexualities exist under other names, such as biphobia.

Due to what social psychologists call the vividness effect, a tendency to notice only certain distinctive characteristics, the majority population tends to draw conclusions like gays flaunt their sexuality. Such images may be easily recalled to mind due to their vividness, making it harder to appraise the entire situation. The majority population may not only think that homosexuals flaunt their sexuality or are "too gay", but may also erroneously believe that homosexuals are easy to identify and label as being gay or lesbian when compared to others who are not homosexual.

The idea of heterosexual privilege has been known to flourish in society. Research and questionnaires are formulated to fit the majority; i.e., heterosexuals. The status of assimilating or conforming to heterosexual standards may be referred to as "heteronormativity", or it may refer to ideology that the primary or only social norm is being heterosexual.

In the US legal system, all groups are not always considered equal under the law. The gay or queer panic defense is a term for defenses or arguments used to defend the accused in court cases, that defense lawyers may use to justify their client's hate crime against someone that the client thought was LGBT. The controversy comes when defense lawyers use the victim's minority status as an excuse or justification for crimes that were directed against them. This may be seen as an example of victim blaming. One method of this defense, homosexual panic disorder, is to claim that the victim's sexual orientation, body movement patterns (such as their walking patterns or how they dance), or appearance that is associated with a minority sexual orientation provoked a violent reaction in the defendant. This is not a proven disorder, is no longer recognized by the DSM, and, therefore, is not a disorder that is medically recognized, but it is a term to explain certain acts of violence.

Research shows that discrimination on the basis of sexual orientation is a powerful feature of many labor markets. For example, studies show that gay men earn 10–32% less than heterosexual men in the United States, and that there is significant discrimination in hiring on the basis of sexual orientation in many labor markets.

=== Racism ===
Racism is defined as the belief that physical characteristics determine cultural traits, and that racial characteristics make some groups superior. By separating people into hierarchies based upon their race, it has been argued that unequal treatment among the different groups of people is just and fair due to their genetic differences. Racism can occur amongst any group that can be identified based upon physical features or even characteristics of their culture. Though people may be lumped together and called a specific race, everyone does not fit neatly into such categories, making it hard to define and describe a race accurately.

Black people, Native Americans and Roma and Sinti are examples of groups who suffer from racism and marginalization.

==== Scientific racism ====
Scientific racism began to flourish in the eighteenth century and was greatly influenced by Charles Darwin's evolutionary studies, as well as ideas taken from the writings of philosophers like Aristotle; for example, Aristotle believed in the concept of "natural slaves". This concept focuses on the necessity of hierarchies and how some people are bound to be on the bottom of the pyramid. Though racism has been a prominent topic in history, there is still debate over whether race actually exists, making the discussion of race a controversial topic. Even though the concept of race is still being debated, the effects of racism are apparent. Racism and other forms of prejudice can affect a person's behavior, thoughts, and feelings, and social psychologists strive to study these effects.

=== Religious discrimination ===
While various religions teach their members to be tolerant of those who are different and to have compassion, throughout history there have been wars, pogroms and other forms of violence motivated by hatred of religious groups.

In the modern world, researchers in western, educated, industrialized, rich and democratic countries have done various studies exploring the relationship between religion and prejudice; thus far, they have received mixed results. A study done with US college students found that those who reported religion to be very influential in their lives seem to have a higher rate of prejudice than those who reported not being religious. Other studies found that religion has a positive effect on people as far as prejudice is concerned. This difference in results may be attributed to the differences in religious practices or religious interpretations amongst the individuals. Those who practice "institutionalized religion", which focuses more on social and political aspects of religious events, are more likely to have an increase in prejudice. Those who practice "interiorized religion", in which believers devote themselves to their beliefs, are most likely to have a decrease in prejudice.

=== Linguistic discrimination ===
Individuals or groups may be treated unfairly based solely on their use of language. This use of language may include the individual's native language or other characteristics of the person's speech, such as an accent or dialect, the size of vocabulary (whether the person uses complex and varied words), and syntax. It may also involve a person's ability or inability to use one language instead of another.

In the mid-1980s, linguist Tove Skutnabb-Kangas captured this idea of discrimination based on language as the concept of linguicism. Kangas defined linguicism as the ideologies and structures used to "legitimate, effectuate, and reproduce unequal division of power and resources (both material and non-material) between groups which are defined on the basis of language".

=== Neurological discrimination ===
==== High-functioning ====
Broadly speaking, attribution of low social status to those who do not conform to non-autistic expectations of personality and behaviour. This can manifest through assumption of 'disability' status to those who are high functioning enough to exist outside of diagnostic criteria, yet do not desire to (or are unable to) conform their behaviour to conventional patterns. This is a controversial and somewhat contemporary concept; with various disciplinary approaches promoting conflicting messages what normality constitutes, the degree of acceptable individual difference within that category, and the precise criteria for what constitutes medical disorder. This has been most prominent in the case of high-functioning autism, where direct cognitive benefits increasingly appear to come at the expense of social intelligence.

Discrimination may also extend to other high functioning individuals carrying pathological phenotypes, such as those with attention deficit hyperactivity disorder and bipolar spectrum disorders. In these cases, there are indications that perceived (or actual) socially disadvantageous cognitive traits are directly correlated with advantageous cognitive traits in other domains, notably creativity and divergent thinking, and yet these strengths might become systematically overlooked. The case for "neurological discrimination" as such lies in the expectation that one's professional capacity may be judged by the quality of ones social interaction, which can in such cases be an inaccurate and discriminatory metric for employment suitability.

Since there are moves by some experts to have these higher-functioning extremes reclassified as extensions of human personality, any legitimisation of discrimination against these groups would fit the very definition of prejudice, as medical validation for such discrimination becomes redundant. Recent advancements in behavioural genetics and neuroscience have made this a very relevant issue of discussion, with existing frameworks requiring significant overhaul to accommodate the strength of findings over the last decade.

== Multiculturalism ==
"Stopping" people
you have nothing in common with

And if you don't stop people that you've never seen before, that you have nothing in common with, your country is going to fail. ... This double-tailed monster [of green energy and immigration] destroys everything in its wake, and they cannot let that happen any longer. You're doing it because you want to be nice, you want to be politically correct, and you're destroying your heritage.

— President Donald Trump
to the UN General Assembly,
September 23, 2025

Humans have an evolved propensity to think categorically about social groups, manifested in cognitive processes with broad implications for public and political endorsement of multicultural policy, according to psychologists Richard J. Crisp and Rose Meleady. They postulated a cognitive-evolutionary account of human adaptation to social diversity that explains general resistance to multiculturalism, and offer a reorienting call for scholars and policy-makers who seek intervention-based solutions to the problem of prejudice.

== Reducing prejudice ==
Prejudice and allophilia

=== Contact hypothesis ===
The contact hypothesis predicts that prejudice can only be reduced when in-group and out-group members are brought together.

Academics Thomas Pettigrew and Linda Tropp conducted a meta-analysis of 515 studies involving a quarter of a million participants in 38 nations to examine how intergroup contact reduces prejudice. They found that three mediators are of particular importance: Intergroup contact reduces prejudice by (1) enhancing knowledge about the outgroup, (2) reducing anxiety about intergroup contact, and (3) increasing empathy and perspective-taking. While all three of these mediators had mediational effects, the mediational value of increased knowledge was less strong than anxiety reduction and empathy. In addition, some individuals confront discrimination when they see it happen, with research finding that individuals are more likely to confront when they perceive benefits to themselves, and are less likely to confront when concerned about others' reactions.

=== Jigsaw (teaching technique) ===
In Elliot Aronson's "jigsaw" teaching technique there are six conditions that must be met to reduce prejudice. First, the in- and out-groups must have a degree of mutual interdependence. Second, both groups need to share a common goal. Third, the two groups must have equal status. Fourth, there must be frequent opportunities for informal and interpersonal contact between groups. Fifth, there should be multiple contacts between the in- and the out-groups. Finally, social norms of equality must exist and be present to foster prejudice reduction.

== See also ==
- Allport's Scale
- Ambivalent prejudice
- Benevolent prejudice
- Bias
- Collective responsibility
- Common ingroup identity
- Conformity
- Fascism
- Hate crime
- Hate speech
- Hostile prejudice
- Human rights
- Idée fixe (psychology)
- In-group and out-group
- Milgram experiment
- Nazism
- Political correctness
- Prejudice from an evolutionary perspective
- Presumption of guilt
- Reverse discrimination
- Social influence
- Soft bigotry of low expectations
- Stigma management
- Stigma
- Suspension of judgment
- Terrorism
- Tolerance
- Totalitarianism
