= Women-are-wonderful effect =

Psychological and sociological phenomenon

The women-are-wonderful effect is the phenomenon found in psychological and sociological research which suggests that people associate more positive attributes with women than with men. This bias reflects an emotional bias toward women as a general case. The phrase was coined by Alice Eagly and Antonio Mladinic in 1994 after finding that both male and female participants tend to assign positive traits to women, with female participants showing a far more pronounced bias. Positive traits were assigned to men by participants of both sexes, but to a far lesser degree.

The authors supposed that the positive general evaluation of women might derive from the association between women and nurturing characteristics. This bias has been cited as an example of benevolent sexism.

== Background ==
The term was coined by researchers Alice Eagly and Antonio Mladinic in a 1994 paper, where they had questioned the widely held view that there was prejudice against women. They observed that much of the research had been inconclusive in showing a bias. They had found a positive bias towards women in their 1989 and 1991 studies, which involved questionnaires given to students in the United States.

In 1989, 203 psychology students of Purdue University were given questionnaires in groups of 20 and asked to assess subjects of both genders, which showed a more favourable attitude to women and female stereotypes.

In 1991, 324 psychology students of Purdue University were given questionnaires in groups of 20 and asked to assess subjects of both genders. They evaluated the social categories of men and women, relating the traits and expectations of each gender through interviews, emotion-associations and free-response measures. Women were rated higher in attitudes and beliefs but not emotions.

== In-group bias ==
Rudman and Goodwin conducted research on gender bias that measured gender preferences without directly asking the participants. Subjects at Purdue and Rutgers participated in computerized tasks that measured automatic attitudes based on how quickly a person categorizes pleasant and unpleasant attributes with each gender. Such a task was done to discover whether people associate pleasant words (good, happy, and sunshine) with women, and unpleasant words (bad, trouble, and pain) with men.

This research found that while both women and men have more favorable views of women, women's in-group biases were 4.5 times stronger than those of men. Furthermore, only women (not men) showed cognitive balance among in-group bias, identity, and self-esteem, revealing that men lack a mechanism that bolsters automatic preference for their own gender.

Other experiments in this study found people showed automatic preference for their mothers over their fathers, or associated the male gender with violence or aggression. Rudman and Goodwin's suggested that maternal bonding and male intimidation influences gender attitudes.

Another experiment in the study found adults' attitudes were measured based on their reactions to categories associated with sexual relations. It revealed that among men who engaged more in sexual activity, the more positive their attitude towards sex, the larger their bias towards women. A greater interest in and liking of sex may promote automatic preference for the out-group of women among men, although both women and men with sexual experience expressed greater liking for the opposite gender.

One study found that the effect is mediated by increased gender equality. The mediation comes not from differences in attitudes towards women, but in attitudes towards men. In more egalitarian societies, people have less negative attitude towards men than in less egalitarian societies.

== Effects ==
Those who exhibit the women-are-wonderful effect tend to react negatively to research that "[puts] men in a better light than women".

=== Gender equality ===
A study with participants from 44 countries involving prediction of an individual's personality based on photographs verified the effect in multiple countries and found that the effect decreased the higher a country's measure of gender equality. This effect seemed to be due to men being viewed less negatively the more egalitarian a country was, rather than women being viewed less positively.

== Gender roles ==
According to Kristin Anderson, the women-are-wonderful effect is applicable when women follow traditional gender roles such as child nurturing and stay-at-home housewife. However, authors Laurie Rudman and Peter Glick have cited studies indicating that the effect is still applicable even when women are in nontraditional gender roles, and the original Eagly, Mladinic & Otto (1991) study discovering the women-are-wonderful effect found no such ambivalence.

== See also ==
- Benevolent prejudice
- Counterstereotype
- Gender empathy gap
- Gender stereotypes
- List of cognitive biases
- Lookism
- Male expendability
- Misandry
- Missing white woman syndrome
- Role congruity theory
- Stereotype
- Stereotype fit hypothesis
