= Old-fashioned racism =

Type of racism

Old-fashioned racism (OFR) is a type of racism that asserts that minorities are biologically inferior to white people. OFR is also associated with the belief that minorities should be segregated from white society, and that minorities do not deserve policies to help mitigate the barriers of discrimination.

== Definition ==
People who exhibit old-fashioned racism endorse derogatory statements about the innate capabilities and intellect of minorities. Proponents are also likely to support racial segregation of schools and housing. OFR has mostly been applied to white perceptions of black people in the US, though there is evidence of old-fashioned racism towards other minority groups such as Muslims. OFR is also known as traditional racism, Jim Crow racism, and blatant racism.

== History ==
Though old-fashioned racism was highly prevalent in the US from approximately 1940–1990, OFR generally fell out of favor and was replaced by laissez-faire racism or symbolic racism. These forms of racism de-emphasize biological inferiority of minorities. Instead, they are characterized by the belief that minorities do not uphold traditional American values, particularly the Protestant work ethic. The scholar Michael Tesler argues that the election of the first black president Barack Obama in 2008 caused a resurgence of old-fashioned racism in US society. Tesler found that both overt, old-fashioned racism and racial resentment influenced how people perceived Obama.
