= Tokenism =

Making a perfunctory or symbolic effort towards including minority groups

In sociology, tokenism is the social practice of making a perfunctory and symbolic effort towards the equitable inclusion of members of a minority group, especially by recruiting people from under-represented social-minority groups in order for the organization to give the public appearance of racial and gender equality, usually within a workplace, government, or a school. The sociological purpose of tokenism is to give the appearance of inclusivity to a workplace or a school that is not as culturally diverse (racial, religious, sexual, etc.) as the rest of society.

== History ==
The social concept and the employment practice of tokenism became understood in the popular culture of the United States in the late 1950s.

In the face of racial segregation, tokenism emerged as a solution that though earnest in effort, only acknowledged an issue without actually solving it.

In the book Why We Can't Wait (1964), civil rights activist Martin Luther King Jr. discussed the subject of tokenism, and how it constitutes a minimal acceptance of black people to the mainstream of U.S. society.

When asked about the gains of the Civil Rights Movement in 1963, human rights activist Malcolm X answered:

Tokenism is hypocrisy. One little student in the University of Mississippi, that's hypocrisy. A handful of students in Little Rock, Arkansas, is hypocrisy. A couple of students going to school in Georgia is hypocrisy. Integration in America is hypocrisy in the rawest form. And the whole world can see it. All this little tokenism that is dangled in front of the Negro and then he's told, "See what we're doing for you, Tom." Why the whole world can see that this is nothing but hypocrisy? All you do is make your image worse; you don't make it better.

Malcolm X highlights that tokenism is used as a tool by the United States to improve its image but fails in its attempts.

For instance, in 1954, the United States ruled segregation in public schools unconstitutional through the Brown v. Board of Education case. Malcolm X references Little Rock, Arkansas, where nine students sought to fight for their rights to attend school.

On September 4, 1957, Arkansas National Guard troops were sent around Central High School to prevent the entry of nine African American students into an all-white school, defying federal law. President Eisenhower federalized the Arkansas National Guard and used federal troops to uphold the law.

While this marked the day that ignited change within Arkansas' school system for African-American children, desegregation did not constitute equality. All nine of the students were brutally bullied by white students and this behavior was encouraged by the school's administration.

Malcolm X's example of Little Rock exemplifies how tokenism can be intended to create the impression of social inclusiveness and diversity without bringing about any significant changes to the inclusion of underrepresented groups.

== In psychology ==
In the field of psychology, the broader definition of tokenism is a situation in which a member of a distinctive category is treated differently from other people.

The characteristics that make the person of interest a token can be perceived as either a handicap or an advantage, as supported by Václav Linkov. In a positive light, these distinct people can be seen as experts in their racial/cultural category, valued skills, or a different perspective on a project. In contrast, tokenism is most often seen as a handicap due to the ostracism of a selected sample of a minority group.

Linkov also attributes drawbacks in psychology to Cultural and Numerical Tokenism, instances that have shifted where value of expertise is placed and its effect on proliferating information that is not representative of all the possible facts.

== In the workplace ==
A Harvard Business School professor, Rosabeth Moss Kanter, asserted back in 1977 that a token employee is usually part of a "socially-skewed group" of employees who belong to a minority group that constitutes less than 15% of the total employee population of the workplace.

By definition, token employees in a workplace are known to be few; hence, their alleged high visibility among the staff subjects them to greater pressure to perform their work at higher production standards of quality and volume and to behave in the expected, stereotypical manner.

Given the smallness of the group of token employees in a workplace, the individual identity of each token person is usually disrespected by the dominant group, who apply a stereotype role to them as a means of social control in the workplace.

In order to avoid tokenism within the workplace, diversity and inclusion must be integrated to foster an environment where people feel connected and included. Employees must be hired on the basis of their capabilities rather than their gender, ethnicity, race, and sexuality.

Tokenism can also have an impact on mental health in the workplace. According to one study, racial minorities also experience heightened performance pressures related to their race and gender; however, many reported that racial problems were more common than gender problems.

Being a token makes one appear more visible within the workplace, placing more scrutiny and pressure for them to represent an entire group. Anxiety, stress, exhaustion, guilt, shame and burnout can arise from overworking in efforts to become a good representative of their identity group.

In professor Kanter's work on tokenism and gender, she found that the problems experienced by women in typically male-dominated occupations were due solely to the skewed proportions of men and women in these occupations.

For example, women are often underrepresented within the STEM field, where women also sometimes face more hostile working environments where discrimination and sexual harassment are more frequent. Women in STEM may experience greater performance pressure to work harder in a male-dominated field while also experiencing social isolation from the males within their workplace. The pressure to perform better can be influenced by the stereotype of women being less competent in mathematics and science. These non-inclusive measures contribute to the lack of women in STEM.

Professor Kanter found that being a token evoked three behaviour consequences of visibility, polarization, and assimilation. Firstly, tokens often felt that they were being watched all the time, leading to the feeling of more pressure to perform well. In attempts to perform well, tokens will feel the need to work harder and strive for perfection. Secondly, polarization implies that the dominant group are uncomfortable around tokens or feel threatened by them due to their differences. As a result, tokens may experience social isolation from the exclusion of the majority group. Finally, tokens will feel the need to assimilate to the stereotyped caricature of their roles. For instance, women will feel forced to perform the "suitable behaviour" of a woman in reinforcing the behaviour of stereotypes attached to which they are associated with.

There has been much debate surrounding the concept of tokenism behind women directors on corporate boards. Since men disproportionately occupy the majority of board seats globally, governments and corporations have attempted to address this inequitable distribution of seats through reform measures.

Reform measures include legislation mandating gender representation on corporate boards of directors, which has been the focus of societal and political debates. All-male boards typically recruit women to improve specialized skills and to bring different values to decision making.

In particular, women introduce useful female leadership qualities and skills like risk averseness, less radical decision-making, and more sustainable investment strategies. However, the mandate of gender diversity may also harm women. Some critics of the mandate believe that it makes women seem like "space fillers", which undermines the qualifications that women can bring to their jobs.

== In politics ==
In politics, allegations of tokenism may occur when a political party puts forward candidates from under-represented groups, such as women or racial minorities, in races that the party has little or no chance of winning, while making limited or no effort to ensure that such candidates have similar opportunity to win the nomination in races where the party is safe or favoured. The "token" candidates are frequently submitted as paper candidates, while nominations in competitive or safe seats continue to favor members of the majority group.

The end result of such an approach is that the party's slate of candidates maintains the appearance of diversity, but members of the majority group remain overrepresented in the party's caucus after the election—and thus little to no substantive progress toward greater inclusion of underrepresented groups has actually occurred.

Legal scholar David Schraub writes about the use of "dissident minorities" by political movements to give themselves a veneer of legitimacy while promoting policies that the majority of the minority group opposes. He uses the examples of anti-Zionist Jews and African-American conservatives, both of which dissent from their demographic group's consensus position on matters critical to their group's collective liberation or interests.

These "dissidents" from minority groups are accused of either allowing the majority to tokenize them, or willingly tokenizing themselves as a shield against complaints and accusations made by the rest of that minority, and an excuse for the majority to avoid addressing or considering the concerns of the minority in question. Sometimes they may actively work to exclude non-dissident members of their group, to preserve their social and political power within the movement they support.

Schraub contends that the majority of the movement dissident minorities support values them not for their contributions but for their identity, since more weight is given to people of minority background when talking about issues concerning that minority. If they break ranks and criticize their political movement, they often find themselves shunned, since they are no longer a reliable token.

== In fiction ==
In fiction, token characters represent groups which vary from the norm (usually defined as a white, heterosexual male) and are otherwise excluded from the story.

The token character can be based on ethnicity (e.g. black, Hispanic, Asian), religion (e.g. Jewish, Muslim), sexual orientation (e.g., gay), gender (typically a female character in a predominantly male cast) or disability.

Token characters are usually background characters, and, as such, are usually disposable and are eliminated from the narrative early in the story, in order to enhance the drama, while conserving the main characters.

== In television ==
Tokenism, in a television setting, can be any act of putting a minority into the mix to create some sort of publicly viewed diversity. A racial divide in TV has been present since the first television show that hired minorities, Amos 'n' Andy (1928–1960), in 1943.

Regardless of whether a token character may be stereotypical or not, tokenism can initiate a whole biased perception that may conflict with how people see a specific race, culture, gender or ethnicity.

From The Huffington Post, America Ferrera states:

"Tokenism is about inserting diverse characters because you feel you have to; true diversity means writing characters that aren't just defined by the color of their skin, and casting the right actor for the role".

Ethnic and racial representation in television has been proven as an educational basis to inform mass audiences. However, tokenism leads to a narrow representation of minority groups, and this trend often leads to minority characters being exposed in negative or stereotypical fashions.

Research done as early as the 1970s suggests an early recognition and disapproval of tokenism and its effects on perceptions of minority groups—specifically, perceptions of African Americans.

Tokenism seemed to be used as a quick fix for the complete void of major/recurring minority roles in television, but its skewed representation lacked room for thoroughly independent and positive roles. Throughout that decade, major broadcast networks including NBC and ABC held a collective 10:1 ratio of white characters to black characters, a much smaller margin of which had recurring African American characters. At that, the representation of African American women was much slimmer.

The use of these token characters often portrayed African American people to stand in sidekick positions to their white counterparts. Research completed on token ethnic characters into the new millennium has found that the representation of males has grown in numbers, but has not improved in negative portrayal.

Statistics on token ethnic characters still suggest toxic masculinity in African American males; threateningly powerful stereotypes of African American women; hyper-sexuality of African American and Asian women; and effeminate characteristics in Asian men and men of other racial minorities.

== In the media ==
Just like television, tokenism in the media has changed over time to coincide with real-life events.

During the years of 1946–87, The New Yorker was analyzed to determine how often and in what situations black people were being portrayed in the magazine's cartoon section.

Over the 42 years of research, there was only one U.S. black main character in a cartoon where race was not the main theme, race was actually completely irrelevant. All cartoons from the earliest times depicted black people in the U.S. in stereotypical roles. In the late 1960s and early 1970s, cartoons were mostly racially themed, and depicted black people in "token" roles where they are only there to create a sense of inclusion.

Tokenism appears in advertising as well as other subdivisions of major media. Tokenism is interpreted as reinforcing subtle representations of minorities in commercials. Studies have shown that, among other racial minorities, Asian Americans are targeted by advertising companies to fulfill casting diversity, but are the most likely ethnic minority to be placed in the backgrounds of advertisements.

Black characters being the first characters to die was first identified in Hollywood horror movies of the 1930s, notes writer Renee Cozier. The Oscars ceremonies have received criticism over a lack of representation of people of color, as critics have pointed towards a lack of minorities nominated for awards, particularly in 2015 and 2016, when not a single actor of color was nominated. Around this time, minorities accounted for 12.9% of lead roles in 163 films surveyed in 2014, according to the 2016 Hollywood Diversity Report.

=== Film examples ===
Since the release of the original three Star Wars films and the later three prequels, there has been much discussion, on Twitter and Reddit especially, of this use of tokenism.

The character of Lando Calrissian (portrayed by Billy Dee Williams) and Mace Windu (portrayed by Samuel L. Jackson) have been cited as two human characters of a racial minority that appear on screen. Lando was one of the first developed black characters in a science-fiction film at the time.

Loyola Marymount University Professor of African American Studies, Adilifu Nama, has stated that this character is "a form of tokenism that placed one of the most optimistic faces on racial inclusion in a genre that had historically excluded Black representation."

When the first film of the newest installment of the franchise, The Force Awakens, was released in 2015, the conversation shifted. Where in the past two trilogies the main three characters were two white men and a white woman, in the new trilogy the main trio consists of a black man (John Boyega), a Hispanic man (Oscar Isaac), and a white woman (Daisy Ridley).

Directed by Ryan Coogler, the film Black Panther portrays the heroes of the fictional African kingdom of Wakanda as godlike. They possess otherworldly sophistication by virtue of their blackness, in contrast to longstanding tendencies in mainstream film toward tokenism, stereotyping, and victimhood in depictions of people of African descent.

The superhero the Black Panther, a.k.a. King T'Challa, learns to stand in solidarity with the oppressed, even those in whose oppression he has been unwittingly complicit, such as the children of the African diaspora. As a result, the film can function as catalyst for reflection on the part of viewers in terms of how they might perceive more clearly the complexity, variety, and ambiguity represented by blackness, whether others' or their own, and how they, too, might identify with the Other.

In G.B.F., directed by Darren Stein, the film tells the journey of two closeted gay teens, Tanner and Brent, on their quest to popularity in high school.

The film explores the theme of tokenism through demonstrating the desire of a homosexual male best friend by typically heterosexual women. The three most popular girls in school: Fawcett Brooks, Caprice Winters, and 'Shley Osgood believe that the key to winning the prom queen title is through acquiring a gay best friend.

In media, gay best friends are displayed as sassy, effeminate, fashionable, and flamboyant, making them act as a stock character accessory to the main character.

While Tanner and Brent plan to become popular through exposing their sexuality, the girls are disappointed to find out that Tanner contradicts the stereotypical gay men they have seen in television. The film shows how harmful it can be to associate gay stereotypes with gay characters.

Film critic Armond White cited the Sight and Sound Greatest Films of All Time poll in 2022 as an example of tokenism. He wrote that the poll had become "a referendum on political correctness" which "prefers feminist, black, queer politics—not cinephilia.

== See also ==
- Affirmative action
- Ambivalent prejudice
- Benevolent prejudice
- Color-blind casting
- I'm not racist, I have black friends
- Model minority
- Performative activism
- Quotaism
- Race and ethnicity in the United States
- Smurfette principle
- The Spook Who Sat by the Door (film)
