= Neo-orientalism =

Category of modern incarnations of Orientalist thinking

Neo-orientalism is a category of modern incarnations of Orientalist thinking. The term Neo-orientalism is generally found in academic literature to critique Western attitudes to Islam and the Islamic world post 9/11.

Although the term Neo-orientalism marks a change from classical Orientalism, the two concepts nevertheless share similarities. For example, Neo-orientalism is Orientalism, criticised as being "monolithic, totalizing, reliant on a binary logic, and based on an assumption of moral and cultural superiority over the Oriental other," according to Mubarak Altwaiji, Ali Behdad and Juliet A. Williams. Neo-orientalism should thus be understood more as "a supplement to enduring modes of Orientalist representation".

However, Neo-orientalism also maintains distinctive characteristics from its predecessor. According to Behdad and Williams again, "First, whereas classical Orientalists were commonly male European savants, philologists, established writers and artists, neo-Orientalists tend to be ordinary Middle Eastern subjects whose self-proclaimed authenticity sanctions and authorizes their discourses. Contemporary neo-Orientalists are not, however, merely 'native informants' or 'comprador intellectuals' . . . but rather Middle Eastern women and men who use their native subjectivity and new-found agency in the West to render otherwise biased accounts of the region seemly more authoritative and objective. Second, in contrast to classical Orientalism’s apparent privileging of philological, cultural, and formalistic concerns over ideological ones, neo-Orientalism is marked by an unapologetic investment in and engagement with the politics of the Middle East."

Moreover, unlike Orientalism, the term does not yet seem to have an agreed upon definition by authors and scholars. For example, Maajid Nawaz adapted the term to criticize the Southern Poverty Law Center for adding his name to a list of public figures it claims are anti-Muslim extremists.

Unlike Orientalism, which serves as a critical approach to representations of Eastern Culture in its entirety, the present dialogue concerning neo-Orientalism seems to focus on predominantly Muslim countries, and in particular, the Middle East and North Africa.
