= Ambivalent sexism =

Theoretical framework

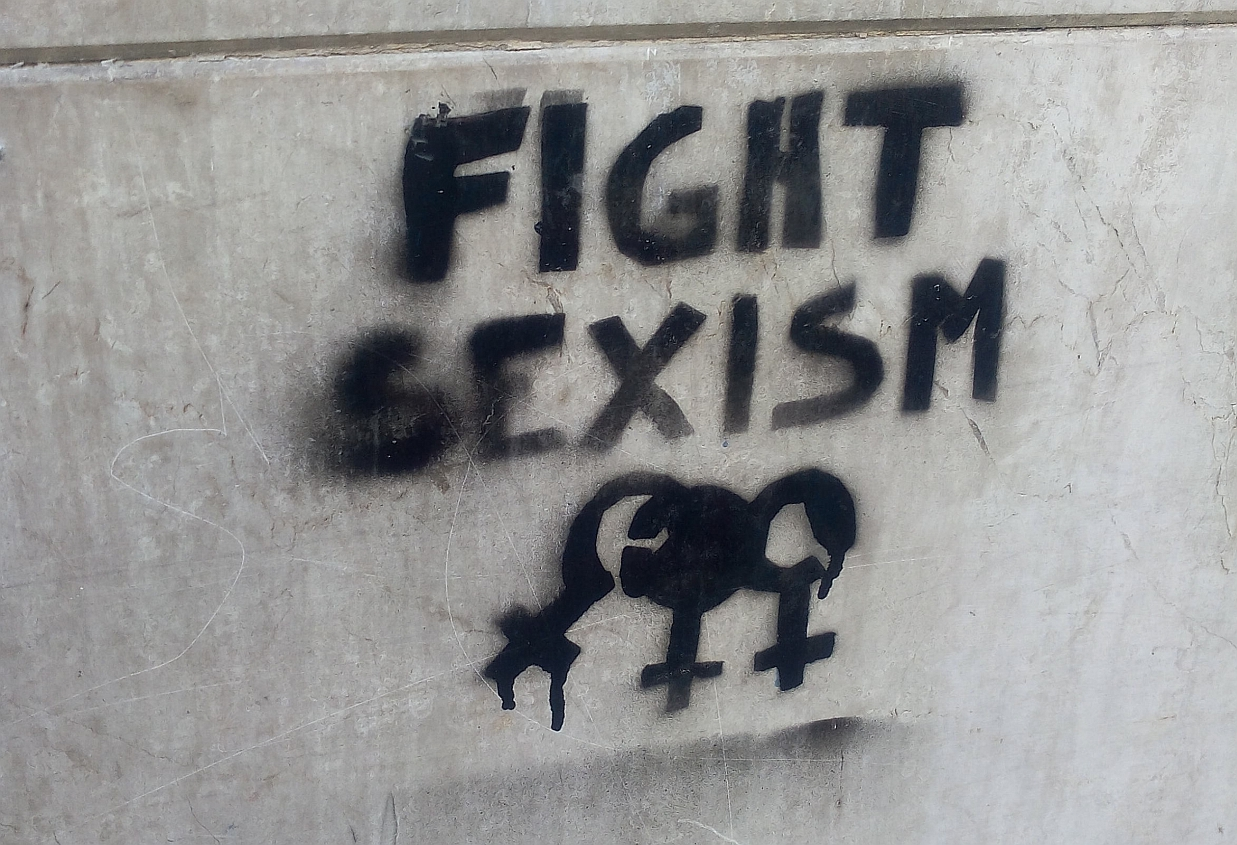
"Fight sexism" graffiti in Turin November 2016

Ambivalent sexism is a theoretical framework which posits that sexism has two sub-components: hostile sexism (HS) and benevolent sexism (BS). Hostile sexism reflects overtly negative evaluations and stereotypes about a gender (e.g., the ideas that women are incompetent and inferior to men). Benevolent sexism represents evaluations of gender that may appear subjectively positive (subjective to the person who is evaluating), but reflect gender inequality (e.g., the idea that women need to be protected by men). For the most part, psychologists have studied hostile forms of sexism. However, theorists using the theoretical framework of ambivalent sexism have found extensive empirical evidence for both varieties. The theory has largely been developed by social psychologists Peter Glick and Susan Fiske.

== Overview ==
=== Definition ===
Sexism, like other forms of prejudice, is a type of bias about a group of people. Sexism is founded in conceptualizations of one gender as being superior or having higher status than the other gender in a particular domain, which can lead to discrimination. Research has indicated that stereotypes about socially appropriate gender roles for women and men are a driving factor in the endorsement of sexism. Patriarchy, defined as men's power and "structural control over political, legal, economic, and religious institutions", is a feature of sexism and is related to hostile attitudes toward women. Anthropological research suggests that patriarchy is pervasive among the majority of human societies, such that women have been systematically discriminated against, oppressed, and marginalized by men throughout history. Sexism maintains patriarchal social structures and reinforces prescribed gender roles.

Typically, sexism is thought of as hostility toward women, perpetrated by men. However, both women and men can (and often do) endorse sexist beliefs about each other and themselves. In other words, men can express sexist attitudes about women or men, and women can express sexist attitudes about men or women. While sexism has historically disadvantaged women, there are negative consequences of sexism for both men and women. Rigid gender roles can be damaging to women and men alike, restricting opportunities and promoting gender-based prejudice. For the purposes of this article, sexism toward women will be the focus, as it is most relevant to the definition and study of ambivalent sexism.

Ambivalent sexism offers a multidimensional reconceptualization of the traditional view of sexism to include both subjectively benevolent and hostile attitudes toward women. The word ambivalent is used to describe the construal of sexism because this type of bias includes both negative and positive evaluations of women. The addition of a benevolent feature to definitions of gender-based prejudice was a major contribution to the study of sexism and field of psychology. Traditional conceptualizations of sexism focused almost entirely on overt hostility toward women. While historians, anthropologists, feminist scholars, and psychologists had previously suggested that sexism involves positive and negative evaluations of women, the majority of empirical research at the time evaluated only hostile expressions of sexism. The introduction of the Ambivalent Sexism Inventory (ASI)—a scale which was developed by Glick and Fiske in 1996, and which assesses ambivalently sexist attitudes—marks a shift in how sexism is construed and scientifically measured. Glick and Fiske created the ASI to address a proposed deficiency in the measurement of sexism at the time. They argue that previous scales assessing sexism do not adequately capture the ambivalent nature of gender-based prejudice toward women.

=== Theoretical framework ===
Glick and Fiske assert that hostile and benevolent sexism complement each other in reinforcing traditional gender roles and preserving patriarchal social structures of women as subordinate to men. Both forms of sexism share the assumption that women are inferior and restrict women to a lower social status. Hostile sexism reflects misogyny (i.e., the hatred of women by men) and is expressed through blatant negative evaluations of women. Examples of hostile sexism include beliefs about women as incompetent, unintelligent, overly emotional, and sexually manipulative. Benevolent sexism reflects evaluations of women that are seemingly positive. Examples of benevolently sexist attitudes include the reverence of women in wife, mother, and child caretaker roles, the romanticizing of women as objects of heterosexual affection, and the belief that men have a duty to protect women. While benevolent sexism may not appear to be harmful to women on the surface, these beliefs are extremely caustic to gender equity and restrict women's personal, professional, political, and social opportunities. This is because these seemingly positive evaluations imply that (a) women are weak and need to be protected, (b) women should not deviate from traditional gender roles as mothers and caretakers, and (c) women should be idolized by men for their sexual purity and availability.

Because benevolently sexist attitudes appear positive, people often do not identify these beliefs as a form of gender-based prejudice. Furthermore, benevolent sexism may be seen by both men and women as reinforcing of the status quo, which some individuals may find comforting. Social and cultural norms may encourage benevolently sexist beliefs among women and men. A classic illustration of this is the endorsement of modern-day chivalry in interactions between women and men. It can be considered traditional and polite for a man to insist that he holds a door open or carries a heavy object for a woman. However, this tradition is founded in historical representations of women as weaker than men. In these types of circumstances, people may find it difficult to distinguish between kindness, tradition, and benevolent sexism. Men and women often disagree on whether or not a specific incident should be considered sexist. In general, women and men tend to show more agreement in classifying extreme and overt expressions of sexism. Hostile sexism is typically easier for people to identify as an expression of prejudice.

Overall, women are rarely perceived by others in an entirely hostile or benevolent manner. In fact, people frequently report high levels of both benevolent and hostile sexism. There are individual differences in people's levels of benevolent and hostile sexism, such that a person can be rated highly on both, one, or neither dimension of the Ambivalent Sexism Inventory. In addition, women are not immune from endorsing sexist beliefs about women. Extensive research supports the idea that it is common for women and men to support ambivalently sexist attitudes about women. Despite this, people find it difficult to believe that others can endorse both benevolent and hostile sexism. Research suggests that, when individuals are shown profiles of a benevolently sexist man and a man who endorses hostile sexism, they feel that it is very unlikely that one person can embody both forms of bias.

=== Sub-components and dimensions ===
Social psychologists have suggested that sexism may be inherently different from other forms of ambivalent prejudice, in that there is interdependency between women and men in social structures. A central argument to the theory of ambivalent sexism is the idea that there is a complicated balance of power between men and women, such that men have structural power and women have dyadic power (stemming from dependence between two people). Dyadic power reflects the notion that men depend on women to fulfill certain goals, such as heterosexual intimacy and childbearing. Glick and Fiske assert that men's dependence on women is what fuels benevolently sexist attitudes, leading to idolization and the placing of women on a pedestal. In other words, power relationships between men and women foster an ambivalent form of bias towards women.

Theoretically, each form of sexism is composed of three subcomponents: paternalism, gender differentiation, and heterosexuality. Paternalism reflects views of women as underdeveloped adults, providing justification for men to be authoritative and monitor, protect, and make decisions on women's behalf. Gender differentiation promotes the assumption that biological differences between males and females justify the strict adherence to socially prescribed gender roles. Heterosexuality—described as the most prominent cause of men's ambivalence toward women—reflects a tension between genuine desires for closeness and intimacy and a fear of women attaining power over men through sexual attraction.

Within hostile sexism (HS) and benevolent sexism (BS), the three subcomponents serve distinct functions. Dominative paternalism (HS) suggests that men should control women, while protective paternalism (BS) implies that men should protect and care for women. Competitive gender differentiation (HS) bolsters men's self-confidence (e.g., men are superior to women). Complementary gender differentiation (BS) places importance on traditional gender roles for women (e.g., mother and wife) and assumes that men depend on women to fulfill these roles. Lastly, heterosexual hostility (HS) views women as sexual objects for men's pleasure and promotes the fear of women's capacity to manipulate men by engaging in or withholding sexual activity. Intimate heterosexuality (BS) romanticizes women as having sexual purity and views romantic intimacy as necessary to complete a man.

== Ambivalent Sexism Inventory ==
Researchers typically measure ambivalent sexism at the individual level. The primary method used to measure an individual's endorsement of ambivalent sexism is the Ambivalent Sexism Inventory (ASI), created by Glick and Fiske in 1996. The ASI is a 22-item self-report measure of sexism on which respondents indicate their level of agreement with various statements, which are placed on a 6-point Likert scale. It is composed of two sub-scales that may be independently calculated for sub-scale scores or may be averaged for an overall composite sexism score. The first sub-scale is the hostile sexism scale, which is composed of 11 items designed to assess an individual's position on the dimensions of dominative paternalism, competitive gender differentiation, and heterosexual hostility, as previously defined. A sample item from the hostile sexism sub-scale is "Women are too easily offended." The second sub-scale is the benevolent sexism scale, which is composed of 11 items that aim to assess an individual's position on the dimensions of protective paternalism, complementary gender differentiation, and heterosexual intimacy, as previously defined. A sample item from the benevolent sexism sub-scale is "Women should be cherished and protected by men."

Over fifteen years of additional research and replications support that this inventory possesses psychometric characteristics indicating that the measure is both empirically reliable and valid. Standard criteria in psychological research can be utilized to evaluate a scale. Using statistics, a Cronbach's alpha coefficient can be calculated to indicate whether items on a scale seem to be measuring the same psychological construct or dimension (demonstrating the retestability of a scale). Generally, researchers agree that a Cronbach's alpha coefficient above 0.80 suggests strong reliability in a scale. The ASI has consistently demonstrated this empirical reliability over time. In addition, empirical evaluations of the ASI provide support for the validity of the scale, such that the inventory seems to effectively measure what it proposes to assess: a polarized attitude towards women, where both dimensions can be activated simultaneously.

The utility of the ASI is not limited to English speakers. There is extensive support for the cross-cultural validity of the ASI. A cross-cultural study examining the theory of ambivalent sexism in 19 countries found that hostile and benevolent components of sexism are not culturally specific. Furthermore, research suggests that ambivalently sexist attitudes towards men exist, such that hostile and benevolent attitudes toward men are found cross-culturally. These studies provide additional empirical evidence that support the framework of ambivalent sexism.

=== Critiques ===
While the ASI is widely used and accepted among researchers, one limitation of the ASI is that it is a self-reported measure. Social desirability is a common limitation of self-report measures in survey research; when participants in a research study complete a written self-report questionnaire, respondents are vulnerable to answering the items in a socially desirable manner. For this reason, some researchers employ variations of the ASI in their study designs that do not require self-reports. For example, Dardenne, Dumont, and Bollier (2007) transformed some items from the ASI into scenarios, presenting them to participants to induce conditions of both hostile and benevolent sexism. Hebl, King, Glick, Singletary, and Kazama (2007) designed a field study in which they observed the sexist behaviors of others; they used the theory of ambivalent sexism and the ASI to generate items for their own measure to assess these observed behaviors.

Another criticism of the ASI is that the labels of the two sub-constructs, "benevolent" and "hostile", are too abstract, do not generalize to certain languages, and may not be relevant to some cultures.

Lastly, findings from the Conn, Hanges, Sipe, and Salvaggio (1999) study suggest that other sexism scales may measure ambivalent attitudes towards women. Glick and Fiske originally proposed the theoretical framework of ambivalent sexism as filling a gap in the psychological literature and providing a novel tool for assessing a new dimension of sexism: benevolent sexism. However, Conn and colleagues (1999), using confirmatory factor analysis, showed that the Modern Sexism Scale (Swim, Aikin, Hall, and Hunter, 1995) captures ambivalent sentiments toward women, such that it identifies individuals that appear nonsexist but actually endorse sexist attitudes. Results from this study suggest that, while both the Modern Sexism Scale and the ASI assess ambivalence toward women, the ASI is unique in its capabilities for separately measuring both hostile and benevolent attitudes. In addition, the ASI captures heterosexual intimacy and benevolent paternalism, whereas the Modern Sexism Scale does not.

== Research ==
While many individuals endorse both benevolent and hostile sexism simultaneously, research suggests that people rated significantly higher in one of the two sub-components have distinct constellations of beliefs and patterns of behavior. In other words, someone who is high in benevolent sexism tends to show a different profile of attitudes than someone who is high in hostile sexism. The independence of these types of sexism in predicting human behavior indicates that the two are, in fact, discrete forms of bias on separate but related axes. Examples of research findings identifying disparate outcomes between benevolent sexism and hostile sexism are described below. In addition, the relationships between ambivalent sexism and a range of other related attitudes and behaviors are discussed.

=== Attitudes toward sexual harassment, intimate partner violence, and rape ===
Men who are ambivalently sexist (i.e., high in both benevolent and hostile sexism simultaneously) and men who are high in hostile sexism are more likely to tolerate the sexual harassment of women than men who are benevolently sexist. Overall, hostile sexism is associated with acceptance of sexual harassment. In addition, the endorsement of hostile sexism is related to attitudes about intimate partner violence perpetrated by men towards women, such that people that are high in hostile sexism are more tolerant of intimate partner violence. Benevolently sexist attitudes were not found to be a significant predictor of the tolerance of intimate partner violence. However, the endorsement of benevolent sexism was not a protective factor either. Lastly, men high in hostile sexism are more likely to rape women, whereas men that are high in benevolent sexism are more likely to blame a victim of rape for the attack.

=== Close relationships and attraction ===
Research has shown that sexist attitudes relate to preferences for certain characteristics in romantic partners. Evidence suggests that women with higher levels of benevolent sexism have more stereotypical preferences in men as romantic partners, such as financial security and resources. Men with higher levels of hostile sexism are more likely to value physical attractiveness in women as romantic partners. In addition, benevolent sexism tends to predict mate selection, whereas hostile sexism tend to predict subsequent marriage norms after pairing. Women find men high in benevolent sexism attractive, and rate men high in ambivalent sexism as less attractive. Furthermore, in a recent research study on a particular aspect of benevolent sexism, protective paternalistic beliefs, women endorsed more protective paternalistic beliefs for men (toward women) in romantic versus work contexts. The endorsement of these beliefs in romantic contexts is thought to serve to reinforce and maintain such benevolent sexist behaviors. Overall, benevolent sexism and hostile sexism are associated with beliefs that premarital sex is unacceptable for women.

=== Women in the workplace ===
While the consequences of hostile sexism in the workplace are more widely known and accepted, research has shown that benevolent sexism may have a more severe impact on a women's cognitive performance. Dardenne, et al.(2006) suggested that hostile sexism can elicit anger or frustration in the target, which may increase her motivation to succeed or perform. Benevolent sexism, because of its seemingly positive evaluations and implicit attributions, is likely to hinder a woman's confidence and performance. The researchers showed that, in a typical team working environment, hostile sexism as well as benevolent sexism had consequences for the participant's performance. Masser and Abrams (2004) highlighted the fact that previous research has shown that benevolent sexism can have detrimental effects on a woman's performance evaluation if that woman violates social norms associated with certain sexist attitudes. Their study showed that hostile sexism, but not benevolent sexism, hurt women's evaluations and recommendations for promotion.

Additionally, studies have shown that benevolent sexist attitudes lead to lower professional evaluations from men and women. Using an experimental design, Masser and Abrams (2004) found that individuals with hostile sexist attitudes rated women lower when applying for a male-dominant position. Additionally, high hostile sexist individuals recommend men to fill the available position more often than women. The authors argue that this is one of the main contributors to the glass ceiling effect.

=== Help-seeking ===
In an experimental study on the effects of benevolent sexism on help-seeking behaviors, researchers found that, when stereotypes of women as dependent were made salient, female college students were less willing to seek help. In addition, the more that help was sought, the worse women felt. Therefore, benevolent sexism appears to hold consequences towards women's help-seeking when certain benevolent sexist stereotypes are made salient.

=== Voting behaviour ===
During the 2016 US presidential election, researchers connected ambivalent sexism to voting intentions. In a non-representative sample of US voters, predominantly male, ambivalent sexism was found to be the sole predictor of intending to vote for someone other than Hillary Clinton in the election. For every step up on the Ambivalent Sexism Inventory, participants were 3.3 times more likely to be voting for someone other than Hillary Clinton. Of those not voting for Clinton, they were not necessarily being pulled over to the Trump campaign, but rather, many were intending to vote third-party or were still undecided. While higher Islamophobia predicted a vote for Trump, lower Islamophobia and higher ambivalent sexism predicted being undecided or voting for a Third Party.

Ambivalent sexism may also be endorsed by the media in the presentation of electoral candidates, consequentially influencing voting behaviour. In the article The Psychology of Voting, Digested a study is noted which revealed that "obesity is a disadvantage for female candidates, but may help male candidates". This is one example of how media coverage of female electoral candidates can prioritise appearance over capability, often using the former to shed a negative light over the latter.

It's also important to acknowledge that ambivalent sexism has a disproportionate effect on women of colour, and groups of women who may be more so marginalised because of the physical geography of where, or socio-political condition in which they live. The cost of voting participation may be too high for women; as put in an economic journal on female voting behaviour in Pakistan, this might be because of "cultural stereotypes that discourage the exercise of own preferences". That is to say in an election, for example, the outcome may be a relatively low count of female voters when women are unable to choose to be active political agents alongside other socio-cultural responsibilities.

=== Plan A vs. Plan B ===
Benevolent sexism is sometimes also referred to as Plan A. It can be used to have women act as a subordinate because it aims for the remarks to be perceived as 'good' or 'positive'. This targets a woman's sensitivity and need to be protected by a male, which may not seem as bad to some women. Plan B or hostile sexism is used as a more aggressive approach as it includes more harsh remarks, and can tend to anger women more. Studies show that women are more likely to be defensive and inspired to protest against sexism when exposed to hostile sexist statements. When exposed to benevolently sexist remarks, they are less likely to rally and protest. They take on a more subordinate and passive role. This is why benevolent sexism is Plan A when trying to get women to be subordinate.

=== Women's endorsement ===
Both benevolent and hostile sexism are considered legitimizing ideologies, in that these attitudes provide the justification for social inequalities between men and women. Social dominance orientation (SDO; Sidanius & Pratto, 1999) asserts that group-based inequalities are systematically reinforced by the disadvantaged group's adoption of the dominant group's ideology and social stratification. Empirical research has consistently supported the validity of social dominance theory, and the SDO model of structural oppression may be particularly apt to describe how patriarchy is perpetuated.

Researchers have explored reasons for why women might internalize ambivalently sexist attitudes towards women. Fischer (2006) found that women may develop benevolently sexist attitudes as a response to experiencing sexism themselves. Cross-cultural research suggests that women's endorsement of benevolent sexism often reflects a culture of extreme hostile sexism among men in a given community. Some researchers argue that, in cultures that are particularly hostile, women may internalize benevolent sexism as a protective mechanism.

Some research indicates that women perceived men high in benevolent sexism to possess positive attitudes towards women, while by contrast men low in benevolent sexism were perceived to be misogynistic and possessing high levels of hostile sexism, when in reality men who reject benevolent sexism also tend to reject hostile sexism. If the man stated that his rejection of benevolent sexism was motivated by egalitarian values then the perception that he was a hostile sexist was somewhat mitigated, though not entirely.

=== Political campaign strategies and gendered messaging ===
One analysis focuses on how mixed sexism affected politics, especially during the 2016 U.S. Presidential election. It shows how Donald Trump's "woman card" comments against Hillary Clinton demonstrated that sexism shapes political views and actions. This suggests that gender-focused criticisms in campaigns can trigger sexist attitudes, causing divided support among voters based on their views on sexism. This emphasizes the importance for campaigns to rethink using gendered stories and consider the advantages of shifting to more inclusive messages.

== See also ==
- Ambivalent prejudice
- Internalized sexism
- Sentencing disparity
- Women-are-wonderful effect
- Aversive racism
