= Benevolent prejudice =

Superficially positive form of prejudice

Benevolent prejudice is a superficially positive prejudice expressed in terms of positive beliefs and emotional responses, which are associated with hostile prejudices or result in keeping affected groups in inferior societal positions. Benevolent prejudice can be expressed towards those of different race, religion, ideology, country, sex, sexual orientation, or gender identity.

Some of the earliest and most notable studies on benevolent prejudice were conducted by researchers Susan Fiske and Peter Glick, with the primary focus of their research being the issue of sexism. Benevolent prejudice derives from their studies on ambivalent sexism, claiming that there are two main types of sexist attitudes: hostile and benevolent sexism.

The term benevolent sexism eventually broadened into benevolent prejudice, with one of the earliest uses of the term being in a study by Susan Fiske and Peter Glick that focused on benevolent and hostile sexism across cultures.

== Application ==
Benevolent prejudice is a superficially positive type of prejudice expressed in terms of apparently positive beliefs and emotional responses. Though this type of prejudice is associated with supposedly good things in certain groups, it still results in keeping the group members in inferior positions in society. Benevolent prejudices can help justify any hostile prejudices a person has toward a particular group. It is defined by UK LGBT rights charity Stonewall as "expressions of positive views about minority groups that are not intended to demonstrate less positive attitudes towards them, but which may still produce negative consequences".

Evidence also shows that there is a correlation between benevolent prejudices and hostile prejudices towards a particular group, in particular regarding the issue of benevolent prejudice towards women and misogyny. Prejudiced, benevolent ideologies become very attractive to subordinate group members, such as women, because they do not appear to contradict self and group interests.

== Examples ==
=== Race ===
In an experiment run by Judd, Park, Ryan, Brauer, and Kraus (1995), perceptions of African Americans held by European Americans show that they held hostile beliefs, indicating that they viewed African Americans as hostile, cliquish, irresponsible, and loud. However, the same European American participants held benevolent beliefs that African Americans were athletic, musical, religious, and had strong family ties. The study was also done with African American participants who were asked to share their beliefs about European Americans. The African Americans said that European Americans were self-centered, greedy, stuffy/uptight, and sheltered from the real world. However, the same African Americans held benevolent beliefs that European Americans were intelligent, organized, independent, and financially well-off.

=== LGBT and people with disability ===
A Stonewall UK publication (Understanding Prejudice: Attitudes towards minorities) published in 2004 has found that interviewees used benevolent stereotyping of gay men as "fun" and "caring stereotypes" of individuals with disabilities, saying they were "vulnerable and in need of protection". This was seen as contrasting to the negative prejudices of travellers and asylum seekers, who were often the subject of aggressive prejudice. The survey also stated that:

These stereotypes are not intended to demonstrate a less positive attitude towards these groups, but lesbians, gay men or disabled people can experience these views as negative and discriminatory. This benevolent prejudice demonstrates a lack of understanding of what being disabled or lesbian and gay can mean; a lack of awareness of the more serious discrimination that these groups often experience; and the changing expectations and rights of these minority groups. Other research has suggested that these benevolent attitudes can play an important role in the social exclusion of particular groups, for example because labels like "nice", "kind" and "helpless" can define some minority groups as not competent or suitable for powerful positions.

The survey also showed that men were more likely to exhibit aggressive prejudice, whereas women were more likely to exhibit benevolent prejudice.

=== Sexism ===
Benevolent sexism takes the form of seemingly positive but also patronizing beliefs about women, which works effectively and invisibly to promote gender inequality due to it justifying the system and promising rewards from the more powerful group, in this case, men. Benevolent sexism falls under the radar because most people do not view benevolent sexism as "real sexism" due to the lack of exposure to benevolent sexism, so it remains unchallenged. When benevolent sexists turn out to be perpetrators of domestic sexual assaults, due to them being benevolent and not hostile when convicted, they are less likely to view the act as rape and tend to put more blame on the other party. Benevolent sexists hold a lot of power that can cause harm since they promote acceptance of prejudicial attitudes that perpetuate gender inequalities, which hinder the ability to have equality in relationships and the workplace. In relationships, it is appealing for both men and women with high levels of attachment anxiety to endorse benevolent sexism since it is consistent with the heightened characteristics of attachment anxiety. Benevolent sexism is appealing because it makes people fall into relationship roles that "complete" one another with the belief it will heighten their intimacy goals. On the other hand, men with attachment avoidance are less likely to endorse benevolent sexism in relationships but endorse hostile sexism.

==== Across cultures ====
An experiment run by Glick and Fiske et al. aimed to measure benevolent and hostile sexism across various countries and cultures. The study found that in countries where the levels of hostile sexism were high, the levels of benevolent sexism were also high. Researchers claimed that "the strength of these correlations supports the idea that HS and BS act as complementary forms of sexism." This was exemplified in countries such as Cuba and Nigeria, where men scored higher on sexism, resulting in a higher hostile and benevolent sexism score amongst women; therefore, the results in those countries provided "evidence consistent with the notion that disadvantaged groups adopt the system-justifying beliefs of dominant groups."

==== Within families ====
Family values have an impact on how benevolent sexism affects their children in adulthood, especially if their parents hold benevolent sexist ideology. Parents' benevolent sexism was positively related to conservation values because these values upheld the desire to "protect women from harm." In other words, conservation values are seen as a good thing to ensure that women are treated properly but not equally. It is especially apparent when a father has high levels of benevolent sexism because they interpret their sexism as respect towards women instead of a hindrance to their freedom. Since many people do not view it as harmful, these fathers are labeled caring people. These values will then be passed onto their children, where they will be seen as valuing feminine stereotypes instead of sexism.

==== Domains of benevolent sexism ====
- Social ideologies
  - System-justifying beliefs that reflect social norms and tradition
- Violence
  - Justification of violence, such as victim blaming
- Stereotypes
  - Positive stereotypes that are focused on warmth
- Workplace
  - Providing women with paternalistic yet conditional support in the workplace
- Intimate relationships
  - Role-related mating preferences and dating/family norms

=== Media literacy and stereotyping ===
An experiment run by Srividya Ramasubramanian and Mary Beth Oliver aimed to measure the reduction in prejudice in their participants. In the experiment, participants were to watch a media literacy video, and then proceed to read stereotypical and counter-stereotypical news stories about African Americans, Asian-Indians, and Caucasian-Americans. The participants were then prompted to fill out a questionnaire regarding their feelings about the aforementioned groups. The results revealed that the participants were more likely to display benevolent prejudice towards the Asian-Indian group, than to the Caucasian-American or African American group. Benevolent prejudice towards Asian-Indians was seen as a result of the cultural stereotypes associated with the group, such as passivity and deprivation, thus the results were "consistent with the argument that benevolent feelings stem from notions of superiority of dominant groups over subordinate groups seen as incompetent, yet sociable."

== See also ==
- Ambivalent prejudice
- Ambivalent sexism
- Model minority
- Racism
- Prejudice
- Reverse racism
- Stereotype
  - Counterstereotype
  - Positive stereotype
- "Women are wonderful" effect
