= Asian baby girl =

Asian American subculture

Asian baby girls or Asian baby gangsters (ABGs) are members of a subculture and aesthetic originating in Asian American communities. While its origin and meaning are unverified, ABG is most commonly understood to describe an Asian female connected to gang-influenced youth culture or, more loosely, one who presents a Westernized cosmetic and social style. ABGs were generally East and Southeast Asian American women who partook in gang activity.

== History ==
The term was first coined in the 1980s, describing women in Asian American gangs. The origins of the ABG subculture are unclear. Scholars Stacey Salinas and Talitha Trazo, along with writer Vicki Li, attribute the creation of the ABG subculture to Asian American women in California. On the other hand, writer Mai Tran describes a group of Chinese American women from New York as "some of the original ABGs". Unlike other stereotypes such as the model minority myth, lotus blossom, and dragon lady, which were imposed by those outside Asian American communities, the ABG subculture was created by Asian American women themselves.

The term ABG gained traction online in the 2010s through memes on the Facebook group Subtle Asian Traits and YouTube videos such as the Fung Bros' "Types of Asian Girls" and Chow Mane's "Asian Baby Girl". Asian American makeup and fashion content creators furthered its spread through "ABG transformation" makeup tutorials. The transition into the online space reduced the ABG subculture to a stereotype detached from its origins in gang culture. The ABG aesthetic has also become popular on Chinese social media platforms such as Xiaohongshu.

== Characteristics ==
The ABG subculture was generally limited to East and Southeast Asians. Later ABGs were associated with the import car scene, but the subculture broadened to include women in Asian Greek communities and Asian cultural clubs in college, and "rave families" who attended electronic music festivals. San Jose, United States; Toronto, Canada; Vancouver, Canada; and Sydney, Australia, are often called "ABG hubs". ABGs often engage in rebellious behavior, such as vaping, underage drinking, and drug use. ABGs also frequently drink boba, but they may derisively call those who they perceive to be poseurs "Asian boba girls".

The ABG aesthetic is primarily focused on visual aspects, which draws from western standards of beauty as well as communities of other people of color. ABGs may have large fake nails and eyelashes, colored contacts, tattoos, and dyed blonde hair. According to Salinas and Trazo, ABGs often go to Asian American establishments in order to maintain their appearance while participating in fast fashion trends whose products come from Asian factories and sweatshops.

The male counterpart of the ABG, the Asian Baby Boy, also called a "Kevin Nguyen" is the expected dating prospect of the ABG.

== Reception ==
The ABG archetype is largely unknown outside of Asian communities. However, reception among online Asian spaces have been mixed. Salinas and Trazo state that "the ABG became a chance for Asian American female youths to also find their own support system to escape from the many complicated traumas and person, cultural, and social issues they faced." Many argue that this archetype is a direct subversion to several harmful stereotypes imposed onto Asian Americans, such as the model minority myth or lotus blossom stereotypes that describe Asians as submissive, obedient, intelligent, quiet, subservient, soft, fragile, and conforming. Some members of the community write that ABGs reclaim an alternative "identity" defined by agency, sexuality, beauty, and boldness that defy expectations and creates a unique "hybridized Asian American persona" and "Asian American sense of femininity" for the Asian-American diaspora.

Many also argue that the standardization of the ABG archetype is constraining, and creates new, one-dimensional, stereotypes for Asian women to conform to. Elise Kim writes in The Daily Californian: "the expansion of the acronym itself—as a 'baby girl'—is no less than a fetishization masked by glorification." Mai Tran additionally mentions that "the adoption of a mass Asian American narratives repeatedly erases nuance and personalities, in the name of community and relatability." Zoe Zhang writes that the "very existence of the phrase 'Asian baby girl' implies that the default for Asian women is the plain jane, nerdy career women." She further critiques how East Asians online have appropriated the term ABG which had origins in Southeast Asian diaspora in the late 1990s to early 2000s to describe Asian women involved in gangs, criminal activities, and drug use, creating a power imbalance. However, Zhang’s claim that East Asians "appropriated" the ABG subculture from Southeast Asians contradicts the documented history of Chinese women within the ABG subculture.

ABGs are generally perceived as unintelligent, similar to the Valley girl or dumb blonde stereotypes. It is also understood that the term ABG can be prescribed to women, and not self-proclaimed because of these negative connotations.

== In media ==
The Fast & Furious franchise featured depictions of ABGs, though they had few lines. Salinas and Trazo argued that this depiction was primarily focused on sex appeal and ignored issues faced by Asian American women. In the song "3D" by Jung Kook, featured white rapper Jack Harlow uses the term in the context of Asian women making themselves attractive for him.
