= The Slanted Screen =

- Film poster
- Directed by: Jeff Adachi
- Written by: Jeff Adachi
- Produced by: Jeff Adachi; Alex Yeung
- Narrated by: Daniel Dae Kim
- Cinematography: Ann Kaneko
- Edited by: Alex Yeung
- Music by: Michael Becker; Sean Dana
- Production company: Asian American Media Mafia
- Distributed by: Center for Asian American Media; AsianCrush
- Release date: March 19, 2006
- Running time: 62 minutes
- Country: United States

The Slanted Screen is a 2006 documentary film written, produced, and directed by Jeff Adachi which examines the stereotypical portrayals and absence of East Asian males in the cinema of the United States. The film analyzes Hollywood from the silent era to the 21st century.

== Synopsis ==
The Slanted Screen features interviews of variety of Asian American filmmakers, critics, producers, and actors, along with several film clips. It observes stereotypical portrayals of Asian American men in Hollywood such as Mr. Moto and Charlie Chan. The film also discusses the importance of influential Asian actors in Hollywood, such as Sessue Hayakawa and Bruce Lee.

The film is organized in chronological order, examining the portrayal of Asian Americans in Hollywood from around the 1920s to the 21st century and the future of Asian Americans in film. In order to have more inclusive representation, the film highlights the importance of having more roles that are designed for Asian Americans, and also having more directors, writers, and executives of different ethnicities. With the rise of independent Asian American writers writing outside of the Hollywood system getting critics' approval, the film concludes on a positive note and encourages young actors to be rebellious and creative.

== Release and reception ==
The Slanted Screen had its formal premiere on March 19, 2006, at the San Francisco Asian American Film Festival, though the first screening of the film took place at the Laemmle Fairfax Theatre in Los Angeles on March 12, 2006. It was later shown at the New York Independent Film and Video Festival, where it won Best Documentary, and the Berkeley Film Festival, where it won the Grand Festival Prize before its television premiere on PBS in 2007.

=== Critical response ===
G. Allen Johnson of SFGate called it "an informative and extremely entertaining look at how Asian American men have been portrayed by Hollywood." Marilyn Moss wrote in The Hollywood Reporter that the documentary was "a no-nonsense, humorless trek through much footage, without much context and without a large idea." Dennis Harvey's review in Variety noted "squeezing too much material into a TV-styled hour, pic’s insights are mostly superficial."

== Interviewees ==
- Eric Byler
- Gene Cajayon
- Terence Chang
- Frank Chin
- Bobby Lee
- Jason Scott Lee
- Will Yun Lee
- Justin Lin
- Tzi Ma
- Mako
- Dustin Nguyen
- Phillip Rhee
- James Shigeta
- Cary-Hiroyuki Tagawa
- Darrell Hamamoto

== Films and television shows featured ==
The following films and television shows are featured in The Slanted Screen:

- The Cheat (1915)
- The Secret Game (1917)
- Broken Blossoms (1919)
- The Tong Man (1919)
- Shadows (1922)
- The Mask of Fu Manchu (1932)
- The Bitter Tea of General Yen (1933)
- The Mysterious Mr. Wong (1935)
- The Good Earth (1937)
- Mr. Moto's Last Warning (1939)
- The Jade Mask (1945)
- State Department: File 649 (1949)
- Three Came Home (1950)
- The Steel Helmet (1951)
- The Adventures of Dr. Fu Manchu (1956)
- The Bridge on the River Kwai (1957)
- The Crimson Kimono (1959)
- Bonanza, Feet of Clay (1960)
- Bridge to the Sun (1961)
- Flower Drum Song (1961)
- Breakfast at Tiffany's (1961)
- The Brides of Fu Manchu (1966)
- The Green Hornet (1966)
- The Sand Pebbles (1966)
- Thoroughly Modern Millie (1967)
- Fist of Fury (1972)
- Way of the Dragon (1972)
- Enter the Dragon (1973)
- High Plains Drifter (1973)
- The Killer Elite (1975)
- Game of Dh (1978)
- Revenge of the Pink Panther (1978)
- Chan Is Missing (1982)
- They Call Me Bruce? (1982)
- Sixteen Candles (1984)
- Dim Sum: A Little Bit of Heart (1985)
- Year of the Dragon (1985)
- A Great Wall (1985)
- Police Academy 3: Back in Training (1986)
- 21 Jump Street: Christmas in Saigon (1987)
- Tucker: The Man and His Dream (1987)
- Living on Tokyo Time (1987)
- An Unremarkable Life (1989)
- Best of the Best (1989)
- Eat a Bowl of Tea (1989)
- Kinjite: Forbidden Subjects (1989)
- Dragon: The Bruce Lee Story (1993)
- Falling Down (1993)
- Rising Sun (1993)
- Friends (1994)
- Mortal Kombat (1995)
- Fargo (1996)
- Absolute Power (1997)
- Dante's Peak (1997)
- Yellow (1997)
- The Replacement Killers (1998)
- Catfish in Black Bean Sauce (1999)
- Romeo Must Die (2000)
- Mr. Wong (2000)
- The Debut (2001)
- Pearl Harbor (2001)
- Better Luck Tomorrow (2002)
- Charlotte Sometimes (2002)
- Bulletproof Monk (2003)
- The O.C. (2003)
- Mad TV (2003)
- Crash (2004)
- Harold & Kumar Go to White Castle (2004)
- Ethan Mao (2004)
- Lost (2004)
- Torque (2004)
- The Fast and the Furious: Tokyo Drift (2006)

== See also ==
- Stereotypes of East Asians in the United States
- Portrayal of East Asians in Hollywood
