= ABG =

ABG may refer to:

== Businesses and organisations ==
=== Transport businesses ===
- ABG Shipyard, an Indian ship-building firm
- Avis Budget Group, an American car rental company
- Abakan-Avia, a Russian airline (ICAO code: ABG)

=== Other businesses ===
- Aditya Birla Group, an Indian conglomerate
- African Barrick Gold, a Tanzanian mining business
- Authentic Brands Group, an American entertainment licensing company

=== Other bodies ===
- Alpha Beta Gamma, an honor society
- Autonomous Bougainville Government, Papua New Guinea

== Medicine ==
- Arterial blood gas, a blood test
- Air-bone gap, in audiometry

== Places ==
- Abingdon Airport, Australia (IATA code: ABG)
- African Burial Ground National Monument, New York, US
- Altenburger Land, Thuringia, Germany (vehicle registration code: ABG)
- Atlanta Botanical Garden, Georgia, US

== Other uses ==
- Acoustic bass guitar, a musical instrument
- Asian baby girl, a stereotype of East Asian Americans
- Asian Beach Games, a pan-Asian multi-sport event
- Avrom Ber Gotlober (1811–1899), Russian Jewish writer, journalist and educator
- Abaga language, spoken on New Guinea (ISO 636-3:abg)
