= Trauma and PTSD in Asian Americans =

Trauma and post-traumatic stress disorder (PTSD) in Asian Americans is a growing topic related to trauma and racial psychology that requires more attention and research.

PTSD is a disorder listed in the Diagnostic and Statistical Manual of Mental Disorders, Fifth Edition (DSM-5) that describes the disorder developed due to exposure to traumatic events.

The Asian American population is a fast-growing group. In the 2019 Census, over 20 million people identified themselves as Asians, which comprised over 7 percent of the US population. Overall, when compared with other populations, Asians are diagnosed with fewer serious mental illnesses. However, PTSD is common in the Asian population, especially immigrants. Current findings are limited due to the limit of studies on this specific population.

== History and health beliefs ==
The histories of many Asian countries overlap, and being aware of such histories is required in order to provide culturally competent care for the Asian American population. In traditional Asian cultures, Western medicines may not be the people's first choice for their presenting problems. Instead, many Asian Americans would prefer traditional treatments such as dietary changes, acupuncture, cupping, and herbs instead. In this sense, it would be beneficial for practitioners to incorporate some traditional Asian medical approaches into therapy when treating Asian American clients. Some examples include yoga, meditation, and Tai Chi.

== Prevalence ==
Prevalence rate of PTSD are lowest among Asian Americans when compared to all other groups. However, Asian Americans are most likely to be exposed to organized violence. Over 70% of Asian refugees receiving mental health help are due to PTSD. Among the racial groups of White, Latin American, and African American, Asian Americans who were exposed to traumatic events are less likely to be diagnosed with PTSD.

== Interventions ==
The utilization of mental health care depends significantly on the individual's awareness of their need for treatment, access to mental health care facilities, and ability to afford the time and money costs associated with receiving such care. The timeliness of treatment after exposure to traumatic events is critical in the recovery process.

Asian American people tend to receive less mental health care and psychotherapy services when compared to other racial and ethnic groups. Among the Asian Americans who sought mental health help, delays in initiating the treatment sessions are common. The average time of delay is significantly longer than those observed in cases of people from other racial or ethnic groups. In addition, Asian Americans, especially those with lower income and education, tend to seek treatment from general practitioners or religious advisors rather than mental health specialists.

Asian American veterans are physically healthier than veterans of other racial groups, but they report poorer mental health status and are less likely to seek mental health help. Studies have found that Asian Americans are the least likely to seek mental health services than any other racial or ethnic group and that they are about three times less likely to seek mental health help than their White counterparts.

Many barriers prevent Asian Americans from seeking proper mental health interventions. Some examples of such barriers are the myth of model minority, lack of knowledge about mental health issues, lack of cultural competency among mental health workers, lack of multilingual services, insufficient health insurance and high cost of services, lack of data and research on the Asian American population, and others.

=== Cognitive-behavioral therapy (CBT) ===
Cognitive Behavior Therapy (CBT) is suitable for treating Asian Americans for acute problems, including PTSD. It is individualized, short-term, and problem-focused. Most Asian Americans would prefer short-term and problem-focused therapy rather than long-term or open-ended. Thus, CBT is appealing and serves as a popular choice for many patients with Asian American cultural backgrounds.

=== Asian Women's Action for Resilience and Empowerment (AWARE) ===
The Asian Women's Action for Resilience and Empowerment (AWARE) is a culture-specific and trauma-informed intervention designed for Asian American women with trauma and/or PTSD diagnosis. Some targeted symptoms include depressive symptoms, suicidality, substance use, and sexual risk behaviors.
