= William Petersen (demographer) =

American sociologist and demographer (1912–2004)

William Petersen (August 3, 1912 – June 10, 2004) was an American sociologist and demographer.

== Life ==
Petersen was born in Jersey City, New Jersey, on August 3, 1912. He gained a PhD from Columbia University in 1954. He taught in the Sociology Department at the University of California at Berkeley from 1953 to 1956 and 1959 to 1966. He created the term "model minority" to describe his thesis that Japanese American success posed challenges to simple discrimination-based accounts of group socioeconomic differences. From 1966 to 1967, Petersen was professor of sociology at Boston College, and from 1967 to 1978 he was the Robert Lazarus Professor of Social Demography at Ohio State University. He co-authored Dictionary of Demography: Biographies with his wife, Rene, in 1985.

Petersen died on June 10, 2004, at the age of 91.

== Works ==
- Planned Migration: The Social Determinants of the Dutch-Canadian Movement, 1955.
- (ed.) American Social Patterns: Studies of Race Relations, Popular Heroes, Voting, Union Democracy and Government Bureaucracy, 1956
- Population, 1961. Second edition, 1969. Third edition, 1975.
- (ed.) The realities of world communism, 1963
- (ed. with David Matza) Social controversy, 1963
- The Politics of Population, 1964
- 'Success Story: Japanese-American Style', New York Times Magazine, 9 January 1966, pp.20ff
- 'Migration: Social Aspects', International Encyclopedia of the Social Sciences, New York: Macmillan & The Free Press, 1968, Vol. 10, pp.286-292
- Japanese Americans: Oppression and Success, 1971
- (ed.) Readings in Population, 1972
- Malthus, 1979
- (with Rene Peterson) Dictionary of Demography: Biographies, 1985
- 'Politics and the Measurement of Ethnicity', in William Alonso & Paul Starr, eds., The Politics of Numbers, New York: Russell Sage Foundation, 1986
- Ethnicity counts, 1997
- From Persons to People: Further Studies in the Politics of Population, 2003
- Against the Stream: Reflections of an Unconventional Demographer, 2004
