= Bamboo ceiling =

Barriers facing Asian American professionals

The term "bamboo ceiling" is a concept that describes the barriers faced by many Asian Americans in the professional arena, such as stereotypes and racism, particularly with ascending to top executive and leadership positions. The term, coined sometime in the 1980s and in use in the 1990s in the US, popularized in 2005 by Jane Hyun in Breaking the Bamboo Ceiling: Career Strategies for Asians, where she addresses those barriers while also providing solutions to overcome them. Hyun defines the bamboo ceiling a combination of individual, cultural, and organizational factors that impede Asian Americans' career progress inside organizations. The second in Hyun's "Bamboo Ceiling" book series is the 2024 title Leadership Toolkit for Asians: The Definitive Resource Guide for Breaking the Bamboo Ceiling which updates and expands on the content of the first book.

Since the publication of Hyun's book, a variety of sectors (including nonprofits, universities, and the government) have discussed the impact of the ceiling as it relates to people of Asian descent and the challenges they face. As described by a senior writer at Fortune magazine, "bamboo ceiling" refers to the processes and barriers that serve to exclude Asians and Asian-Americans from executive positions on the basis of subjective factors such as "lack of leadership potential" and "lack of communication skills" that cannot actually be explained by job performance or qualifications. Articles regarding the subject have been written in Crains, Fortune, The Atlantic and Forbes (2016).

The term is a derivative of the glass ceiling, which refers to the more general metaphor used to describe invisible barriers through which people of marginalized genders, and/or Black, Indigenous, and racialized peoples can see managerial positions, but cannot reach them. Similar metaphor includes canvas ceiling posed on refugees and their workforce integration efforts.

Based on publicly available government statistics, Asian Americans have the lowest chance of rising to management when compared with African Americans, Hispanics, and women in spite of having the highest educational attainment.

== In the United States ==
=== Underrepresentation of Asian Americans ===
The Civil Rights Act of 1964 prohibited discrimination on the basis of race. However, covert forms of racism persist in the workforce. The Census Bureau reports that Asian Americans have the highest education levels of any racial category in the United States. Of Asian Americans, 52.4% are college graduates, while the national average is 29.9%.

- According to United States Census Bureau, in 2010 the Asian American population accounts for about 5.6% of the total population in the U.S. but only 0.3% of corporate office populations.
- In New York City, Asian Americans have the highest number of associates at top New York law firms, yet the lowest conversion rate to partner.
- Even in fields where Asian Americans are highly disproportionally represented, such as the Silicon Valley software industry, they comprise a disproportionately small percentage of upper management and board positions. Statistics show that despite 33% of all software engineers in the Silicon Valley being people of Asian descent, they make up only 6% of board members and 10% of corporate officers of the Bay Area's 25 largest companies.
- At the National Institutes of Health, though 21.5% of scientists are Asian, they make up only 4.7% of the lab and branch directors.
- According to a study of the 25 largest Bay Area companies 12 had no board members of Asian descent, and five had no corporate officers of Asian descent.
- According to the United States Census 2010, Asian Americans make up 5.6% of the American population, as of 2014, 3% of the district court judges are Asian American. Between 2009 and 2010, President Obama had nominated eight Asian Americans to a seat on the U.S. District Court, four women and four men. Six of the nominations have been confirmed by the Senate except for the nominations of two of the men Edward M. Chen and Goodwin Liu; while all the women were confirmed.
- In 2015, Ascend, an Asian-American professional organization from New York, conducted a study on the Asian-American workforce in several tech companies within Silicon Valley. They found that although there is representation in lower-level positions, where 27% of the professionals were Asian-American, there is an underrepresentation in many executive positions: fewer than 19% of managers and less than 14% of executives were of Asian descent.
- In 2009 a study by the Australian National University showed significant racism in hiring practices. The study found that a Chinese-named applicant would need to put in 68 per cent more applications than a Western-named applicant to get the same number of calls back.
- Asian American women and non-men are specifically underrepresented. Out of all Asian-American women working in tech, only 1 in 285 is an executive.
- In a 2005-2006 study analyzing Asian Americans and Pacific Islander representation on television, multi-university researchers found that 1.8% of broadcast series regulars were Asian American, and there were no Pacific Islander series regulars on television. In a 10-year follow-up study conducted by the same researchers, they found that Asian Americans appeared in only 36% of shows across all streaming platforms. In comparison, 96% of shows aired during 2015-2016 had at least one White series regular.

The bamboo ceiling in the United States is a subtle and complex form of discrimination, and the umbrella term "Asian American" extends to include a number of diverse groups, including South Asians, East Asians, and Southeast Asians. These groups are often subject to "model minority" stereotypes, and viewed as quiet, hardworking, family-oriented, high achieving in math and science, passive, non-confrontational, submissive, and antisocial. In the workforce, some of these perceptions may seem positive in the short-term, but in the long-term they impede progression up the corporate and academic ladders.

While Asian Americans are often viewed as a "model minority" race, many feel that they are an invisible or "forgotten minority", despite being one of the fastest growing groups in the country. Because they are generally considered ineligible for many of the minority rights of underrepresented races, and Asian Americans have been shown to be less likely to report incidents of racial discrimination in the workplace, there are far fewer institutional avenues and programs for them to combat these labels and perceptions.

=== Causes and effects ===
Some analysts attribute the racial disparity in administrative capacities to negative extensions of the aforementioned stereotypes of Asian Americans, such as common assumptions that they are "lacking in leadership skills" or that they have "poor communication abilities". Asian Americans are also sometimes expected to have higher qualifications than their white counterparts, such as graduating from more prestigious universities, to achieve the same positions in American companies.

Recent work displays stereotypes about innovation contributing to the bamboo ceiling. A 2024 study shows that East Asian Americans are perceived to be less innovative. This trait is highly linked to many U.S. organizations, proving that this perception lowers the rate of leadership roles that Asian Americans can land.

Many of these stereotypes and expectations have a basis in cultural misunderstandings. Some Asian Americans claim that they are raised with culture-specific values that affect perceptions of their workplace behaviour. For example, some report being taught from an early age to be self-effacing, reticent, respectful, and deferential towards authority. These values do not translate well into the American workplace, where Asian Americans' respectfulness can be misinterpreted as aloofness, arrogance, and inattentiveness. As a result, Asian Americans are less likely to be seen as having qualities that appeal to American employers, such as leadership, charisma and risk-taking, and are often passed over for promotions in spite of satisfactory or high job performance. Asian Americans are also less likely to aggressively network, self-promote, and speak up at work meetings with concerns and ideas when compared to their coworkers, whilst Asian Americans who do are received negatively.

Another factor may be an existing lack of connections and Asian American role models in upper management and in politics. Until relatively recently with the Civil Rights Movement, a large number of individuals of Asian descent had few political and social rights, or were denied rights of citizenship by naturalisation. While many Asian Americans are active in political life and government positions today, their representation is still disproportionately small, and there remain unofficial barriers to political access.

A survey that was taken revealed that while 83% of Asian Americans felt loyal to their jobs, only 49% felt as though they belonged in the American workforce. According to researchers that study diversity and talent management, 25% of Asians surveyed said "they had felt workplace discrimination because of their ethnicity." Asian American men, more than any other demographic, said they felt stalled in their careers and were more likely to quit their current jobs to search for advancement elsewhere. In another survey, 66% of Asian American men and 44–50% of Asian American women said they felt their careers had stalled, showing that not only do Asian Americans face large amounts of workplace discrimination, but also that Asian American men are discriminated against more than Asian American women by a wide margin, revealing a significant gender disparity.

AAPI of marginalized genders face additional barriers as a result of being both Asian American and not a cis man. Articles estimate that, on average, Asian American women earned 27–40% less than Asian American men, the highest of any racial group.

=== Sticky floor ===
Another commonly cited barrier, complementary to the bamboo ceiling, is the "sticky floor". When applied to the Asian American experience, the sticky floor refers to the phenomenon by which young professionals of Asian descent are often trapped in low-level, low-mobility jobs. Asian Americans graduate from universities in high numbers, and firms tend to hire them in high numbers as well. However, within a few years, many claim to find themselves pigeonholed into dead-end careers with no path for advancement to upper-level corporate careers. This process is visible across a number of fields, including business, academia, and law. Even in areas where Asian Americans are believed to excel, such as software engineering, there is an overall tendency to see them assigned to low-ranking positions with fewer opportunities for advancement compared to other racial groups.

=== Psychology ===
The bamboo ceiling is an issue that many Asian Americans face within the workplace. It is a mix of individual, cultural, and organizational factors that hinder the growth and success of these people in office settings, mainly managerial roles. Stereotypes about Asian Americans' personality characteristics and cultural values may place them at a disadvantage in the workplace.

A psychological experiment was done by two researchers on the bamboo ceiling, and their findings revealed that East Asians who do not conform to racial stereotypes of Asians and possess qualities such as assertiveness, dominance, and leadership skills are less likely to be popular in the workplace, with one researcher stating that "[i]n general, people do not want dominant co-workers, but they really do not want to work with a dominant East-Asian co-worker."

Wesley Yang tried to define what the force is that has held Asian Americans back, and does so by communicating that Asian Americans have a hard time with the networking and highlighting of their own accomplishments, as well as with challenging authority. He adds that Asian Americans tend to be culturally trained to be less flamboyant in the aforementioned skills, which slightly limits their ability to rise above the field in certain professions. To be successful within a managerial role or in a corporate position, it is important for an individual to know how to promote themselves in order to get ahead, but, as Yang and Hyun explain, there are cultural nuances that impede upward mobility for Asian Americans.

Contrary to popular beliefs, Asian Americans do openly ask for the professional rewards they feel that they deserve, but despite their overwhelming desire to climb higher on the corporate ladder as well as the American workforce in general, Asian Americans hit barriers that prevent them from doing so.

=== Breaking the bamboo ceiling ===
The bamboo ceiling is a socially recognized phenomenon, and a number of different methods have been proposed to help address the issue. People also advise that finding a mentor can be beneficial. Mentors are a resource commonly used by other minority groups, such as Hispanics and African Americans, to give advice and be a person to talk to about the issues being faced by their community. Groups such as Asian Pacific Americans in Higher Education and Leadership Education for Asian Pacifics, Inc. provide resources for mentorship. For example, Linda Akutagawa, founder of Leadership Education for Asian Pacifics, Inc., explains how her company provides leadership training for Asian employees, in addition to their mentorship service.

However, some people argue that it should not be the responsibility of Asian Americans to bridge the gap between the differences in their culture and the environment of the standard workplace. So there is an ongoing debate between those who believe that personal adaption is the best solution and those that there are things that the business can do to fix this issue. Some companies have leadership programs designed for Asian Americans to cultivate skills and to help translate values across cultures. Among these inclusive companies is Cisco, which recently created an Advanced Leadership Program for Asian-American Executives at the Stanford Graduate School of Business. The program charges $11,000 for a five-day session. Instead of training Asian Americans to "be more white," some argue that instead, Asian Americans can learn to leverage their cultures and values rather than hiding them.

=== Differentiating Asian American subgroups ===
In 2020, a series of studies conducted by researchers at MIT Sloan School of Management (Jackson G. Lu), University of Michigan (Richard E. Nisbett), and Columbia Business School (Michael W. Morris), re-investigated the Bamboo-ceiling issue in the United States. Published in PNAS, the research highlighted the importance of differentiating Americans of East Asian and South Asian descent.

A 2020 study shows leadership through a different scope, proving how perceived assertiveness is a trait associated with leadership in U.S. organizational culture. Using a large-scale field and experimental source, data found in East Asian Americans are more likely than average to hold leadership roles.

The research found that South Asian Americans' leadership attainment in US is significantly higher than that of East Asians. In addition, South Asians are more likely than Whites to attain leadership positions, as shown by data on the ethnicities of S&P 500 companies' CEOs and senior leadership positions. All findings controlled for demographics factors including English fluency, age, gender, education, tenure at company, personality, home country, and GDP per capita of cultural origin.

Moreover, according to the research, cultural differences in assertiveness is the main reason why East Asian Americans hit the bamboo ceiling, while South Asian Americans are able to transcend it. Compared to South Asians, East Asians are less likely to speak up, engage in constructive debates, and stand their own grounds in conflicts. The difference in culture mediated the leadership attainment gap between East Asians and South Asians in the United States. Thus, the researchers suggest that Bamboo Ceiling is not an "Asian issue", but an issue of cultural fit with the US prototype of leadership.

== Other forms of Asian American underrepresentation in American society ==
=== Media underrepresentation ===
In 2014, Asians made up 5.6% of the U.S. population and accounted for 5.3% of people and characters shown on film.

In 2015, ABC Sitcom Fresh off the Boat aired on television. This was the first time in 20 years that a show featuring predominantly Asian-Americans had been on national TV, the last one being All-American Girl in 1994, which was cancelled after one season.

A major issue in the media industry has been the concept of "white-washing", where white actors and actresses are cast in roles portraying people of color. In 2015, Emma Stone was cast as Allison Ng in the romantic-comedy Aloha. Allison was supposed to be a quarter Hawaiian and a quarter Chinese, but her appearance in the film did not reflect her heritage. This casting choice led to an outcry in the community; the movie was met with negative reviews and a disappointing box office performance, which may have been due in part to the response to the casting choice.

Matt Damon was cast as the lead role in the action movie The Great Wall. Actress Constance Wu from Fresh off the Boat chimed in, stating that Hollywood will find a way to cast white actors no matter what – even in a film set in China 1,000 years ago.

=== Sports underrepresentation ===
In the United States, Asians are stereotyped as being physically and athletically inferior to other races. This has led to much discrimination in the recruitment process of professional American sports where Asian American athletes are now highly underrepresented. In 2015, despite making up 5.6% of the nation's population, Asian American athletes only represented 1.1% of the NFL and 1.2% of the MLB, and as of 2014 0.2% of the NBA.

Basketball is a sport noted for its low number of Asian athletes, despite the fact that the sport's color barrier was broken by an Asian American athlete named Wataru Misaka in 1947. Misaka was the first person of color to play in the NBA. The Utah native played for the New York Knicks.

In American sports, there are and has been a higher representation of Asian American athletes who are of mixed racial heritage in comparison to those of full racial heritage. For instance, former football player Roman Gabriel was the first Asian-American to start as an NFL quarterback and was only of half Southeast Asian descent (Filipino).

=== Political underrepresentation ===
In 2016, 2.6% (14/535) of the members of Congress were Asian Americans, compared to 5.6% of the total population in the United States. Proportional representation would necessitate 30 members out of the 535 in order to mirror the US population.

=== Underrepresentation in business ===
As of 2015, less than 2% of Fortune 500 CEOs are Asian, although they comprise 5.6% of the total United States population, and about 30% of the graduates in the top 20 MBA programs in the last 20 years.

=== Underrepresentation in education ===
Aside from corporate underrepresentation, some believe there is also a bias against students applying to colleges. This existing bias is explained by professor of Public Policy at University of California Riverside, Karthick Ramakrishan, as having a predetermined and singular idea of what an Asian student should be like. This idea of expecting a specific kind of Asian is referred to as being the "model minority". This concept can be explained as a driving factor in admissions process that hurts Asian Americans by having a certain expectation for these students because they are believed to be the "model minority". According to model minority, if an Asian student does not fit into the stereotypical mold, they are seen as useless to the college. Asian-American organizations asked the Department of Education in 2016 to investigate Brown University, Dartmouth College and Yale University, alleging they discriminate against Asian-American students during the admissions process. In other parts of the educational field, Asian Americans are underrepresented in the areas of college admissions and university leadership positions. In addition to this existing bias, there is also the marginalization of Asian American academics in positions of power with only 1% of them reaching the status of university presidents and chancellors despite 7% of the faculty being made up of people who are of Asian descent. In a study conducted by Bryan S. K. Kim, Donald R. Atkinson, and Peggy H. Yang, these disproportionate numbers were attributed to values commonly seen in Asian households that were passed down from parents to children even when living in the United States. These values included "deference to authority figures, respect for elders, self-effacement, [and,] restraint". (Khator, Renu) These practices commonly associated with people of Asian heritage allow for a strong bias to grow against Asian Americans in higher up university positions as administrators begin to believe that they "either have no interest in leadership opportunities or simply won't be good at it" because the traits associated with Asian Americans do not adhere to typical western ideals of leadership (Oguntoyinbo 10). Many Asian Americans such as Frank Wu, chancellor and dean of the University of California Hastings College of the Law, are frustrated with stereotypes like these due to several contradicting facts such as "Asian Americans [being] overrepresented in the academy as students, graduate students and faculty members" and still being barely represented (or sometimes even considered) for upper level academic positions.

== Criticisms of the movement to break the bamboo ceiling ==
=== Intersectionality ===
In an article by Peggy Li, this topic is addressed as she presents an argument stating that neither of the movements to break down the barriers of the glass or bamboo ceiling works in favor of Asian American women because of these intersecting identities. This unspoken patriarchal hierarchy leads to the exclusion of AAPI im/migrant sex workers within Asian communities. The classism and misogyny in Asian communities are being pushed to the side in order to focus on issues that impact cis men in leadership roles and cis men-dominated fields (business or politics). Li continues by attributing this lack of intersectionality to the leadership of the movements. According to Li, in the fight to break the bamboo ceiling, men are making a majority, if not all, the decisions.

=== Highly disproportionate representation in education, medical, tech and research science fields ===
Asians are disproportionally represented in highly paid jobs such as education, medical and tech fields. While Asians only account for 5.6% of the US population, they hold a little less than 19% of management positions in the Silicon Valley tech industry. However, Asians make up more than 50.1% percent of the Silicon Valley tech industry workforce as a whole. This means that while they may be overrepresented in management positions compared to their prevalence in the US population, they are still less likely to advance from a lower position.

== See also ==
- Model minority
- Racism in Australia
