= Subtle Asian Traits =

Facebook group

Subtle Asian Traits (SAT, stylized as subtle asian traits) is a Facebook group dedicated to Internet memes, jokes, and discussion surrounding the Asian experience in the West. Though the posts on the page cover a large range of topics, they mainly focus on Asian culture as experienced by the children of immigrants. The group has over 1.9 million members and has been featured in a variety of mainstream news sources for its insights into the Asian diaspora.

== History ==
The Facebook group was created by 9 high-school Chinese-Australian seniors from Melbourne in September 2018. The high-school seniors thought it would be fun to create a Facebook group to share jokes and experiences of being first-generation Asian-Australians. They named the page "Subtle Asian Traits", inspired by a then-popular Facebook page called "Subtle Private School Traits", which was also started by Australian teenagers. Though the page was intended to be a small community, within three months, Subtle Asian Traits was among the most popular groups on Facebook with more than a million members from around the world.

== Group features ==
Subtle Asian Traits is a closed group on Facebook, which means its members are visible to the public but their comments are not visible until the user has joined the group. A Facebook member must request to join a closed group or be added by an existing member or admin. All members of the group may post and comment in the group, however, all posts must be approved by group moderators before it appears on the page. Subtle Asian Traits currently receives over 500 new posts a day. The group mainly consists of jokes and concepts or catchphrases intended for humorous purposes, also known as Internet memes. An example of a popular Internet meme on the page was a picture of an Asian household with many slippers because slippers are a popular feature in many Asian households. Subtle Asian Traits has inspired a large number of other Facebook groups, such as Subtle Asian Leftovers, Subtle Asian Travel, Subtle Asian Dating, Subtle Asian Dating: Wholesome, Subtle Asian Mental Health, Subtle Curry Traits, and Subtle Christian Traits. The group has caught the attention of celebrities such as Hasan Minhaj, Chris Pang, and Simu Liu. After Hasan Minhaj's Q&A, one viewer commented that felt "like a huge distance between regular folks and celebrities has been abridged.”

Some members have criticized the under-representation of non–East Asian perspectives in Subtle Asian Traits, especially the perspectives of South Asians and Southeast Asians. Subtle Curry Traits was created partly in response to the lack of representation for South Asians. In October 2019, strong controversy arose in the SA and Subtle Curry Girl Traits groups due to a comment in SAT that suggested brown and Indian people are not Asian. Many users described the Subtle Asian Traits community as unsupportive of South Asians and Southeast Asians and harboring "anti-brownness." Samira Sadeque, in The Daily Dot, wrote that the controversy "magnifies an ongoing problem of anti-brown discrimination, or colorism, against Asians by Asians."

Others argue that Subtle Asian Traits memes perpetuate negative stereotypes about Asians, particularly those of tiger parenting and Asians as a model minority. However, it is suggested that the use of stereotypes in memes helps to provide a sense of commonality and community among Asians.
