= Educational attainment =

Degree of education completed

Educational attainment is a term commonly used by statisticians to refer to the highest degree of education an individual has completed as defined by the US Census Bureau Glossary.

== See also ==
- Academic achievement
- Academic degree
- Bachelor's degree
- Master's degree
- Doctorate degree
- Educational attainment in the United States
- Literacy
  - List of countries by literacy rate
- Programme for the International Assessment of Adult Competencies
- School-leaving age
