= Darrell Hamamoto =

American academic

Darrell Y. Hamamoto is an American writer, academic, and specialist in U.S. media and ethnic studies. He was a scholar of Asian American media and professor for almost 23 years at the University of California, Davis before retiring in 2018.

== Education ==
Hamamoto received his education at CSU Long Beach, Bowling Green State University and UC Irvine.

== Influential works ==
He created a 50-minute erotic film named Skin on Skin, which starred Asian American actors and actresses and addresses the desexualization of Asian American males. Hamamoto created another piece called Yellowcaust: A Patriot Act, which includes clips from Skin on Skin and information regarding atrocities committed against Asian Americans in the U.S.'s history. His work has generated controversy for producing porn movies as research.

Hamamoto was featured in both The Daily Show and Masters of the Pillow, which is a documentary about Skin on Skin.

== Conspiracy theories ==
Hamamoto has promoted several conspiracy theories in both his academic and personal life. He has made several appearances on the far-right InfoWars radio program, hosted by conspiracy theorist Alex Jones, where he has promoted the white genocide conspiracy theory, as well as a theory that U.S. Senator John Kerry and the Obama Foundation were involved to a plot to split Hurricane Lane into two separate storms via a secret directed-energy weapon housed in Antarctica. Hamamoto also made a 2014 appearance on the white supremacist and antisemitic Red Ice Radio program.

== Books ==
- Nervous Laughter: Television Situation Comedy and Liberal Democratic Ideology, Praeger, 1991
- Monitored Peril: Asian Americans and the Politics of TV Representation, University of Minnesota Press, 1994
- New American Destinies: A Reader in Contemporary Asian and Latino Immigration, Routledge, 1996
- Countervisions: Asian American Film Criticism (Asian American History and Culture), Temple University Press, 2000
- Servitors of Empire: Studies in the Dark Side of Asian America, Trine Day, 2014
