= Model minority =

Group seen as more successful than average

The term model minority refers to a minority group, defined by factors such as ethnicity, race, or religion, whose members are perceived by the employer of the term to be achieving a higher socioeconomic status in comparison to other minority groups or the population at large. The term is also referred to as the model minority myth because it is understood as a racialized social construct that frames certain minority groups as comparatively successful, culturally adaptable, and morally disciplined while promoting stereotypes that are ultimately harmful.

Model minorities are often regarded as a role model or reference group for comparison to other groups. Their perceived success is typically assessed through metrics including educational attainment, representation within managerial and professional occupations, household income, and various other socioeconomic indicators such as criminal activity and strong family and marital stability. Asian Americans in the United States are prominently associated with this concept. Analogous concepts of classism have been observed in the United Kingdom, leading to the stereotyping of specific ethnic groups. Socioeconomically successful minority groups often share notable parallels, suggesting that their patterns of achievement are closely shaped by distinct historical experiences and sociocultural contexts.

The concept of the model minority has generated controversy due to its historical application to suggest that economic intervention by governments is unnecessary to address socioeconomic disparities among particular racial groups. The model minority concept has been traced back to the Civil Rights Movement in the United States during the late-1950s to 1960s as an antithesis to African American claims of racial discrimination, oppression, and systemic barriers that impeded upward social mobility. The concept was employed to draw contrasts between Asian Americans (particularly those of East and some South Asian origins) and Jewish Americans in comparison to African Americans and Indigenous peoples. Consequently, this perpetuates the propagation of a 'model minority myth', asserting that Asian and Jewish Americans are exemplary law-abiding and productive citizens or immigrants, while concurrently reinforcing the stereotype that Indigenous and African American communities are predisposed to criminal behavior and dependent on welfare. With the turn of the 21st century, the model minority myth has been widely criticized as oversimplistic and misleading, operating as a form of racial bordering—used to justify discriminatory policies, systemic barriers, and neglect marginalized communities.

== Issues ==
The concept of a model minority is heavily associated with U.S. culture, due to the term's origins in American sociologist William Petersen's 1966 article. The United Kingdom has concepts of classism that stereotype ethnic groups in a manner which is similar to the stereotype of the model minority. Generalized statistics, such as higher education attainment rate, high representation in white-collar professional and managerial occupations, and a higher household income than other racial groups in the United States are often cited in support of model-minority status.

A common misconception is that the affected communities typically take pride in being labeled as a model minority. However, the model minority stereotype is considered detrimental to relevant minority communities because it is used to justify the exclusion of such groups in the distribution of (public and private) assistance programs, and it is also used to understate or slight the achievements of individuals within that minority.

There are a wide variety of theories categorizing types of prejudices, and different types of prejudices are believed to be more at play towards different particular groups, one such model being the stereotype content model. Generally speaking, within the American social context, groups such as those with Asian heritage or Jewish heritage are believed to score high on perceived competence but low on perceived warmth and thus are thought to fall into the category of the 'envied outgroup' within the context of this stereotype. Additional studies have shown that when describing a group with the term 'model minority' and associated attributes, responses towards the out-group were significantly more negative than those using other positive attributes. Other scholars have discussed the potential for the stereotype to be the 'positive spin' on the money-mad, stealing and/or greedy Jew or Asian. Recent additional studies have delved into the role of jealous prejudice in instigating certain historical mass casualty events, such as the Holocaust, noting that the theory of the venting of frustrations on an innocent but weak target is a notion that is part of popular "folk psychology" and should be re-examined, arguing instead that envious prejudice plays a relevant role in scapegoating in some social contexts.

Furthermore, the notion of the model minority pits minority groups against one another through the implication that non-model groups are at fault for falling short of the model minority level of achievement. The concept has been criticized by outlets such as NPR and EU Scream for potentially homogenizing the experiences of Asian communities on one side and Hispanics and African Americans on the other, despite the fact that individual groups experience racism in different ways. Critics also argue that the idea perpetuates the belief that any minority has the capability to economically rise without assistance because it ignores the differences between the history of Asian Americans and the history of African Americans, as well as the history of Hispanics, in the United States. It has also been pointed out that the concept, which also has been criticized for over generalizing the success of some community members, has been used to invalidate and render less visible the racism faced by model minorities. Additionally, over generalizing based on a measure success for some members to make the point that racism is over and anyone stating otherwise is "making excuses" is not exclusive to those groups who have been called model minorities, and became a problem for some members of the African American community after Barack Obama's Presidential election.

== United States ==
One of the earliest uses of the term model minority was in the 9 January 1966 edition of The New York Times Magazine by sociologist William Petersen to describe Asian Americans as ethnic minorities which, despite their marginalization, have achieved success in the United States. In his essay titled "Success Story: Japanese American Style", he wrote that the Japanese cultures have strong work ethics and family values which, consequently, lift them above so called "problem minorities", other racial groups whose lack of perceived economic and educational success proved that Japanese Americans had risen above discrimination. Petersen believed that the success of Asian Americans paralleled the success of Jewish Americans.

Petersen's article framed Japanese Americans as an embodiment of success through hard work and ultimately, justified the perception of the United States as a meritocratic society in which so-called "problem minorities" could also rise above racism and discrimination to succeed. Because the 1960s Civil Rights Movement was marked by African American claims of racial oppression, many scholars argue that Petersen's article served to present economic and educational success amongst Japanese Americans as an antithesis to such claims of racial oppression. A similar article about Chinese Americans was published in U.S. News & World Report in December 1966. In addition to Chinese Americans, the model minority term was later applied to Asian Americans groups like Korean Americans, who were also seen as highly educated and successful.

=== Asian Americans ===
Although the term was first coined to describe the socioeconomic success of Japanese Americans, "model minority" eventually evolved to become associated with American Jews and Asian Americans in general, more specifically with East Asians (Japanese, Chinese, and Korean Americans) as well as Indian Americans and other South Asian Americans. By the 1980s, almost all major U.S. magazines and newspapers printed success stories of Asian Americans.

Some scholars have described the creation of the model minority theory as a partial response to the emergence of the civil rights movement, in which African Americans fought for equal rights and the discontinuation of racial segregation in the United States. In reaction to the success of the movement, white America, citing the accomplishments of Asian Americans, argued that African Americans could raise their communities up by focusing on education and accepting and conforming to the racial segregation, institutional racism and discrimination which were all being practiced at that time. At that time however, Asian Americans were also marginalized and racially segregated, which meant that they also represented lower economic levels and faced the same social issues which other racial and ethnic minorities faced.

A few years after The New York Times Magazine article about Asian Americans being the model minority was published, Asian Americans formed their own movement, in which they fought for their own equal rights and the resolution of their own specific social issues. It would be modeled after the Civil Rights Movement, thus, it would effectively challenge White America and the social construct of racial discrimination.

Those who resisted the emergent stereotype in the 1960s–1980s could not gain enough support to combat it due to its so-called "positive" connotations. At the time, this led many, even within the Asian American community, to either view it as a welcomed label in contrast to years of negative stereotypes, or view it as a euphemistic stereotype that was no more than a mere annoyance. Many believe that the stereotype comes with more positives than negatives. In contrast, many critics believe that there are just as many negatives as there are positives, or they believe that stereotypes should never be regarded as "good," no matter how "positive" they are intended to be. Scientific studies have revealed that both socially and psychologically, positive stereotypes have many negative and damaging consequences. According to Marita Etcubañez, a director of Asian Americans Advancing Justice - Los Angeles, misconceptions about Asian Americans have an effect on government policy, as "politicians won't talk about our community's needs if they assume people don't require assistance." According to Yanan Wang writing for the Washington Post, since the 1960s, "the idea that Asian Americans are distinct among minority groups and therefore immune to the challenges which are faced by other people of color is a particularly sensitive issue in the community, which has recently fought to reclaim its place in social justice conversations with movements like #ModelMinorityMutiny." In his paper, "Education and the Socialization of Asian Americans: A Revisionist Analysis of the 'Model Minority Thesis'", B. Suzuki, a researcher of multicultural and Asian American studies at University of Massachusetts Amherst, disagrees with how the media has portrayed Asian Americans. Explaining the sociohistorical background of the contemporary social system, Suzuki argues that the model minority stereotype is a myth.

Following the Civil Rights Era, the model minority term continued to grow in prominence and has been perpetuated by United States media, academia, and popular culture. It is often used to compare model minorities to other minority groups, such as African Americans and Latinos. The growing acceptance of the model minority myth may be partially attributed to the 1965 Immigration Act, which abolished national origin quotas and based admission on skills and profession instead. As a result, from 1965 to 1979, an influx of immigrants from Asia consisted of highly-educated professionals, like physicians and scientists. By the 1980s, many media outlets reported that Asian Americans had skyrocketing college enrollment rates, fueling praise for Asian Americans as a successful minority group due to their superior work ethic. A Fortune magazine article in 1986 by Anthony Ramirez ("America's Super Minority"), for example, stated, "Asian Americans are [simply] smarter than the rest of us, and they push their children to excel in school." The Fortune article, when addressing whether it is a problem that Asian Americans have problems moving up the corporate hierarchy, asserted that Asian Americans would "solve that problem themselves by being self-starters and adapting to American management culture". Another famous example of the model minority myth perpetuated through media was the 1987 Time magazine which featured a cover photo of, "Those Asian American WHIZ KIDS." Today, similar to the skilled-based immigration resulting from the 1965 Immigration Act, many Asian American immigrants who are highly educated are often selected through student visas for higher education, H1-B skill-based visas, or merit-based immigration systems that favors those with advanced degrees or specialized skills. This has led to a disproportionate concentration of highly educated and successful Asian Americans in certain professions, such as medicine, engineering, and technology, that continues to fuel the model minority myth.

Since the creation of the model minority stereotype, Asian Americans have exceeded White Americans in terms of their level of education, as well as many other racial and ethnic groups in American society. As of 2012, Asian Americans as a whole are considered as having obtained the highest educational attainment level and the highest median household income of any racial and ethnic demographic in the country, a position which African immigrants, and their first generation descendants, have just started to outperform them in. These statistics vary among the Asian American population. Historically, achieving economic and educational success was, and at times still is, seen as a gateway by different groups into greater social acceptance. This notion has not always been born out, as for example when Muslim Americans faced widespread hostility and prejudice in the wake of 9/11.

==== Statistics ====
There has been a significant change in the perceptions of Asian Americans. In as little as 100 years of American history, stereotypes of East Asian Americans have changed from them being viewed as poor uneducated laborers to being portrayed as a hard-working, well-educated, and upper-middle-class minority. Proponents of the model minority model erroneously assumed that Asian Americans' perseverance, strong work ethic, and general determination to succeed were extensions of their supposedly quiet natures, rather than common characteristics among most immigrants. Among Indian Americans, an example of the model minority stereotype are phenomena such as the high rates of educational attainment and above average household incomes in the Indian American community. Pointing to generalized data, another argument for the model minority stereotype is generalized data such as from the United States Census Bureau, where the median household income of Asian Americans is $68,780, higher than that of the total population ($50,221). Although some Asian American subgroups including East Asians and South Asians are economically successful, other Asian American subgroups such as Southeast Asian Americans which include Hmong, Laotians, Cambodians, and Vietnamese, are less socioeconomically successful. Asian Americans have developed the greatest income inequality gap in comparison to major racial and ethnic groups in the U.S. The economic gap in the standard of living between higher- and lower-income Asians nearly doubled; the ratio of income earned by Asians at the 90th percentile to income earned by Asians at the 10th percentile increased from 6.1 to 10.7 between 1970 and 2016, respectively.

The model minority model also points to the percentage of Asian Americans at elite universities. Model minority proponents claim that while Asian Americans are only 5% of the U.S. population, they are over-represented at all these schools. Additionally, Asian Americans go on to win a high proportion of Nobel Prizes. Of the 20 American physicists to win a Nobel Prize in the 21st century, East Asian Americans, who represent less than 4% of the U.S. population, have won 15% of prizes. Additionally, three science Nobel prizes have been won by Indian-Americans. Asian American students are concentrated in a very small percentage of institutions, in only eight states (and half concentrated in California, New York and Texas). Moreover, as more Asian Americans become Americanized and assimilated, more Asian American students are beginning to attend two-year community colleges (363,798 in 2000) than four-year public universities (354,564 in 2000), and this trend of attending community college is accelerating. West Coast academic institutions are amongst those that have the highest concentrations of Asian Americans.

The most highly educated group of Asian immigrants are Taiwanese. Education rates of Southeast Asians are low, but these numbers can be considered misleading, as a large percent comes from adult immigrants who came to the United States without any college education due to war. For ages 25 to 34, 45% of Vietnamese Americans have a bachelor's degree or higher compared to 39% of Non-Hispanic Whites.

Due to the impacts of the model minority stereotype, unlike other minority-serving institutions, Asian American Pacific Islander-serving institutions (AAPISI) did not receive federal recognition until 2007, with the passage of the College Cost Reduction and Access Act, which federally recognized the existence of AAPISIs, making them eligible for federal funding and designation as minority serving institutions. According to the Federal Bureau of Investigation's 2003 report Crime in the United States, Asian Americans have the lowest total arrest rates despite a younger average age, and high family stability.

Bachelor's Degree or Higher

Ethnicity or nationality	Percent of Population
Taiwanese	74.1%
Korean	72.8%
Indian	67.9%
Lebanese	64.9%
Russian	60.4%
Sri Lankan	59.0%
Jewish	59.0%
Iranian	57.2%
British	56.6%
Pakistani	53.0%
Chinese	53.0%
Filipino	47.9%
Japanese	44.7%
Bangladeshi	41.9%
Armenian	41.0%
Vietnamese	26.1%
Hmong	16.0%
Cambodian	14.6%
Laotian	13.0%

Personal Income

Ethnicity	Personal Income ($)
British	49,202
Indian	44,098
Japanese	43,132
Lebanese	38,971
Sri Lankan	37,363
Chinese	34,835
Korean	31,790
Filipino	31,289
Arab	28,854
Thai	27,276
Pakistani	26,739
Vietnamese	24,624
Lao	21,479
Cambodian	20,182
Afghan	18,516
Bangladeshi	18,027
Hmong	12,923
Somali	7,856

==== Indian and South Asian Americans ====
The model minority label also includes Indian Americans, because of their high aggregate socioeconomic success. According to the census report on Asian Americans issued in 2004 by the U.S. Census Bureau, 64% of Indian Americans had a bachelor's degree or higher, the second highest for all national origin groups. In the same census, 60% of Indian Americans had management or professional jobs, compared with a national average of 33%. Indian Americans also earn the highest median household income out of all national origin/ethnic groups and the second highest personal income, after Taiwanese Americans. This has resulted in several stereotypes such as that of the "Indian Doctor".

It should however be noted that there are still pockets of poverty within the community, with around 8% classified as living in poverty.

==== Southeast Asian Americans ====
Arguably, the model minority stereotype masks the socioeconomic under performance of other Asian American subgroups and the experiences of Southeast Asian American populations in the U.S. serve to refute the model minority stereotype. For context, Southeast Asian Americans consist of several ethnic groups, including Burmese, Vietnamese, Hmong, Laotian, and Cambodian.

Despite high household incomes, many Southeast Asian Americans and other Asian groups such as Filipinos, Vietnamese, Indonesians, Thais, Laotians, Cambodians as well as South Asian groups such as Nepalese and Pakistani have lower per capita incomes then East Asians.

Per capita income of Asian groups and ethnicities
	Per capita income
Taiwanese	83811
Asian Indian	72389
Sri Lankan	69325
Japanese	61568
Chinese, except Taiwanese	61289
Korean	58560
All Asian (non-Hispanic)	55840
All White (non-Hispanic)	50675
Filipino	47819
Pakistani	45935
Indonesian	44811
Thai	42675
Vietnamese	40037
Nepalese	39993
Laotian	36938
Cambodian	35725
Bangladesh	32739
All Black (non-Hispanic))	31360
Native Hawaiian and Pacific Islander (non-Hispanic)	31811
Hispanic or Latino (of any race)	28026
American Indian and Native Alaskan (non-Hispanic)	26473
Hmong	26232
Burmese	24583

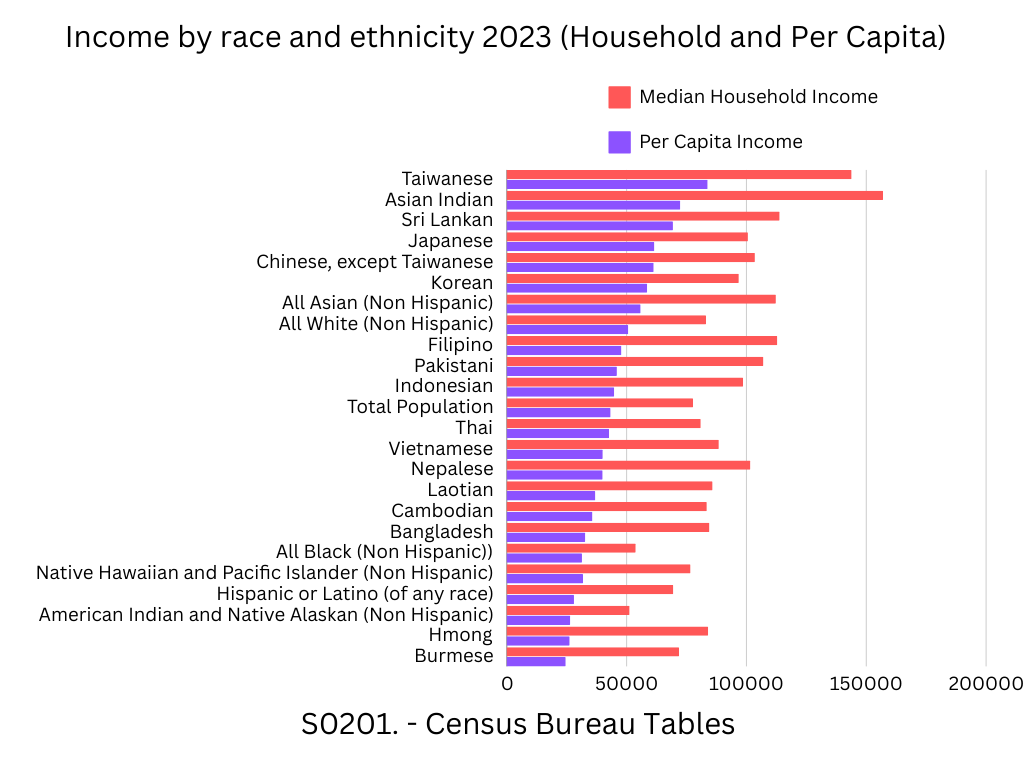
Household and per capita income by race, ethnicity and Asian American group. Model minority myth.

An empirical literature review shows that most of the existing data used to justify the model minority image regarding Asian American academic achievement is aggregated. As a result, this data ignores important differences among individual Asian ethnic groups. Although many Asian Americans have succeeded academically and socioeconomically, survey research shows that recent immigrant groups, such as Southeast Asians, have been unable to replicate such success.

According to the 2010 U.S. census, the overall percentage of people 25 years and older with less than a high school education in the U.S. population is 15%, whereas Asian Americans, as an aggregate, are close at 11.1%. However, disparities exist when comparing South Asian Americans and East Asian Americans with Southeast Asian Americans. For example, only 13.6% of Chinese Americans, 4.0% Japanese Americans, and 6.0% of South Asian Americans ages 25 years or older have less than a high school education. In contrast, Southeast Asian Americans more than double the South Asian American and East Asian American percentages with 38.5% of Cambodian Americans, 39.6% of Hmong Americans, 34.3% of Lao Americans, and 51.1% of Vietnamese Americans ages 25 and over holding less than a high school education.

According to some studies only 39% of Filipino American men (ages 25–34) had attained a bachelor's degree, in comparison to 87% of Asian Indian American men, 69% of Chinese American men, 63% of Japanese American men, 62% of Korean American men, and 42 percent of Vietnamese American men. The same study showed that Filipino, Korean and Cambodian men with bachelor's degrees have lower median wages of $30 an hour compared to Chinese and Indian immigrant men who had median wages of $40 an hour. (Sanchez-Lopez et al. ., 2017).

The 2010 U.S. Census shows that 52% of Asian Americans ages 25 and over hold a bachelor's degree or higher, which is higher than the national American average of 29.9%. In contrast, the percentage of individuals aged 25 and over holding a bachelor's degree or higher amongst Southeast Asian American groups is much lower with only 44.4% of Filipino Americans and 21.2% of Vietnamese Americans falling within the aforementioned educational bounds. With the exception of Vietnamese Americans, Southeast Asian American representation in higher education is lower than other racial minorities, including African Americans (14.2%) and Latino Americans (10.3%). As cited in an empirical literature review, research that lacks differentiation between the varying Asian ethnic groups may mask under-performing groups as the higher performing groups raise the average. As a result, Southeast Asian American students are often overlooked due to the overwhelming success of their East and South Asian American peers.

As cited in a case study, many deficits of Southeast Asian American students' academic achievement can be attributed to the structural barriers of living in an immigrant household. Many Southeast Asian American students are children of refugees from countries at war. While the parents of Southeast Asian American students may have escaped death and persecution from their homelands, they often arrive in the US with fragmented families. As a result, refugees often lack resources, which causes them to not only rely on government assistance, but to also be placed in low-income communities near poorly funded schools. Additionally, families frequently have little to no understanding of the U.S. school system. Thus, Southeast Asian students are at a disadvantage as they have to quickly adjust to the new school system, while also keeping up with native-born students.

However, certain Southeast Asian ethnic groups have shown greater progress than others within the regional group and resemble the success of other more established Asian Americans. As cited in a case study, Vietnamese American students are beginning to show comparable rates of academic success to East Asian American students. Furthermore, among Southeast Asian American students, Vietnamese American students are recognized as having the highest academic performance, whereas Cambodian American students have the poorest performance. Although Cambodian and Vietnamese refugees endured similar immigration hardships, the aforementioned differences in academic success is attributed to structural and cultural factors. Two key factors which may have had an influence on Vietnamese American success is that the majority of first-wave Vietnamese refugees, particularly those who entered the United States immediately after the Fall of Saigon, were generally well-educated elites. Likewise given the economic development in Vietnam and its inherited educational infrastructure, which had been developed to a greater extent during the colonial era compared to Laos and not had been fundamentally sabotaged as had occurred in Cambodia during the Cambodian genocide, the majority of 21st century Vietnamese immigrants to the United States are from non-refugee backgrounds, dissimilar from earlier migration patterns, whilst later migration from Laos and Cambodia into the United States remains low. Furthermore, Southeast Asians of Chinese descent, particularly those who had come out through the route of refugee camps in the 1980s, face similar histories to their native counterparts, with their socioeconomic circumstances being largely reflective of these histories and with their struggles quietly embedded into the broader Southeast Asian identity.

Despite this progress amongst Southeast Asian American students, the subgroup still struggles economically. Similar to data on academic achievement, information regarding Asian American's economic prospects is frequently aggregated and thus hides the diversity of economic struggles amongst subgroups like Southeast Asian Americans. The high poverty rate amongst Hmong Americans places the group in one of the highest poverty brackets within the United States. Hmong Americans, more so men than women, have also been disproportionately racialized and criminalized via gangster stereotyping.

Additionally, median income levels differ amongst Asian American subgroups in which Southeast Asian Americans represent a disproportionate amount of low annual median incomes. This is illustrated by research in which Hmong Americans and Cambodian Americans have a per capita income of $10,366 in comparison to Indian Americans who have a per capita income of around $27,514 and Japanese Americans who have a per capita income of $30,075. By analyzing the individual economic data of Asian American subgroups, it becomes evident that the model minority stereotype, which puts forth the notion of Asian Americans achieving higher levels socioeconomic success, may be misleading. It is also written in Racial Wealth Snapshot by NCRC that Asian Americans disproportionately live in metropolitan areas where cost of living is high and that it is important to factor in household size and cost of living when talking about Asian Americans.

==== Media portrayal ====
Media coverage of the increasing success of Asian Americans as a group began in the 1960s, reporting high average test scores and marks in school, winning national spelling bees, and high levels of university attendance.

In 1988, the writer Philip K. Chiu identified the prevalence of the model minority stereotype in American media reports on Chinese Americans, and noted the contrast between that stereotype and what he observed as the reality of the Chinese-American population, which was much more varied than the model minority stereotype in the media typically presented.

I am fed up with being stereotyped as either a subhuman or superhuman creature. Certainly I am proud of the academic and economic successes of Chinese Americans.… But it's important for people to realize that there is another side.… It is about time for the media to report on Chinese Americans the way they are. Some are superachievers, most are average citizens, and a few are criminals. They are only human—no more and no less.

==== Effects of the stereotype ====
According to Gordon H. Chang, the reference to Asian Americans as model minorities has to do with the work ethic, respect for elders, and high valuation of education, family and elders present in their cultures. The model minority stereotype also comes with an underlying notion of their apoliticality. Such a label one-dimensionalizes Asian Americans as having only traits based around stereotypes and no other human qualities, such as vocal leadership, negative emotions (e.g. anger or sadness), sociopolitical activeness, risk taking, ability to learn from mistakes, desire for creative expression, intolerance towards oppression or being overlooked of their acknowledgements and successes. Asian Americans are labeled as model minorities because they have not been as much of a "threat" to the U.S. political establishment as black people, due to a smaller population and less political advocacy. This label seeks to suppress potential political activism through euphemistic stereotyping.

Another effect of the stereotype is that American society may tend to ignore the racism and discrimination Asian Americans still face. Complaints are dismissed with the claim that the racism which occurs to Asian Americans is less important than or not as bad as the racism faced by other minority races, thus establishing a systematic racial hierarchy. Believing that due to their success and that they possess so-called "positive" stereotypes, many assume they face no forms of racial discrimination or social issues in the greater American society, and that their community is fine, having "gained" social and economic equality.

The stereotyping of Asian Americans as a model minority and perfidious foreigner influences people's perceptions and attitudes towards Asians and also negatively affects students' academic outcomes, relationships with others, and psychological adjustments. For instance, discrimination and model minority stereotyping are linked to Asian American students' lower valuing of school, lower self-esteem, and higher depressive symptoms.

Asian Americans may also be commonly stereotyped by the general public as being studious, intelligent, successful, elitist, brand name conscious, yet paradoxically passive. As a result, Asian Americans have felt as though they have higher and unreasonable expectations due to their race. Also due to the model minority image, Asian American students are viewed as "problem-free" and academically competent students who can succeed with little support and without special services. This emphasis that Asian Americans are being denial by their racial reality because of the assumption that "Asians are the new Whites"; therefore, they are being dismissed by their intelligence and experiences. Thus, educators may overlook the instructional needs and psychological concerns of underachieving Asian American students. The model minority stereotype can also contribute to teachers' having a "blaming the victims" perspective. This means that teachers blame students, their culture, or their families for students' poor performance or misbehavior in school. This is problematic because it shifts responsibility away from schools and teachers and misdirects attention away from finding a solution to improve students' learning experience and alleviate the situation. Furthermore, the model minority stereotype has a negative impact on the home environment. Parents' expectations place high pressure on students to achieve, creating a stressful, school-like home environment. Parents' expressed worry and frustration can also place emotional burdens and psychological stress on students.

Another result of Asian American's regarded as a model minority is limiting the amount of accepted applicants to certain colleges.

Some educators hold Asian students to a higher standard. This deprives those students with learning disabilities from being given attention that they need. The connotations of being a model minority mean Asian students are often labeled with the unpopular "nerd" or "geek" image. Asians have been the target of harassment, bullying, and racism from other races due to the racially divisive model minority stereotype. The higher expectations placed on East Asians as a result of the model minority stereotype carries over from academics to the workplace.

The model minority stereotype is emotionally damaging to many Asian Americans, since there are unjustified expectations to live up to stereotypes of high achievement. The pressures from their families to achieve and live up to the model minority image have taken a tremendous mental and psychological toll on young Asian Americans. The model minority stereotype also influences Asian American students' psychological outcomes and academic experience. The model minority image can lead underachieving Asian American students to minimize their own difficulties and experience anxiety or psychological distress about their academic difficulties. Asian American students also have more negative attitudes toward seeking academic or psychological help due to fear of shattering the high expectations of teachers, parents, and classmates.

==== Possible causes of model minority status ====
===== Selective immigration =====
One possible cause of the higher performance of Asian Americans as a group is that they represent a small population in America so those who are chosen to move to America often come from a selective group of Asians. The relative difficulty of emigrating and immigrating into the United States has created a selective nature of the process with the U.S. often choosing the wealthier and more highly educated out of those with less resources, motivation or ability to immigrate.

Asian Americans are the nation's fastest growing ethnic group due to their high rate of immigration. 59% of all Asian Americans are foreign born. The majority of Asian Americans are either 1st or 2nd generation immigrants, with the Asian-American population increasing from only 980,000 in 1960 to 22.4 million in 2019. Due to their high rate of immigration, the Asian American population nearly doubled from 11.9 to 22.4 million in the period between 2000 and 2019 – an 88% increase. For reference, the Black population grew by 20% during this span, while there was virtually no change in the White population.

Asia is a much larger pool of skilled workers as the continent has 4.2 billion people, 60% of the world population. This far outnumbers the next two most populous continents of Africa (15% total world population) and Europe (10%). 82% of Asian American workers in STEM fields were foreign born, as well as 81% of the entirety of the Asian workforce.

In 2016, Indian and Chinese nationals accounted for 82% of all issued H1-B Visas, a work permit that allows skilled foreign workers to go to the United States and work for American companies.

As of May 2016, 77% of the 1.2 million international students enrolled in the United States hailed from Asia.

The Indian immigrant population predominantly comes from higher-caste backgrounds. These groups have historically held social, educational, and economic advantages within India, and are more likely to maintain a relatively higher socioeconomic standing after immigrating. This continuity of advantage demonstrates how pre-migration caste-based privilege can translate into post-migration class privilege, thereby shaping patterns of integration, mobility, and representation within diaspora communities.

===== Cultural differences =====
Cultural factors are thought to be part of the reason why East Asian Americans are successful in the United States. East Asian societies often place more resources and emphasis on education. For example, Confucian tenets and Chinese culture places great value on work ethic and the pursuit of knowledge. In traditional Chinese social stratification, scholars were ranked at the top—well above businessmen and landowners. This view of knowledge is evident in the modern lifestyle of many East Asian American families, where the whole family puts emphasis on education and parents will make it their priority to push their children to study and achieve high marks. Similar cultural tendencies and values are found in South Asian American families, whose children similarly face extra pressure by parents to succeed in school and to achieve high-ranked jobs. Although pressure is often perceived as a way to help East Asian American descendants achieve greater success, it can be used as a way to provide better income and living status for families. In other words, much of the East Asian American success in the United States can be due to the stereotypical yet favorable characteristics that their background holds. In most cases, East Asians such as Chinese, Japanese, Korean, and Taiwanese Americans hold a high position in terms of successful educational goals.

Others counter this notion of culture as a driving force, as it ignores immigration policies. In the mid-1800s, Asian immigrants were recruited in the United States as laborers for agriculture and to aid in the building of the first transcontinental railroad. Many worked for low wages in the harshest conditions. Confucian values were not seen as a key to success. It was only until the Immigration and Nationality Act of 1965 changed the way Asians were seen, as Asians with higher education backgrounds were selectively chosen from a larger pool of the Asian population.

Further, it has also been argued the myth of the Confucian emphasis on education is counterfactual. It also implies Asians are a monolithic group, and ignores the fact that the most educated group of Asian immigrants in the U.S. are Indians, for whom Confucius is virtually non-existent in their upbringing. It has also been argued that self-selecting immigrants do not represent the actual Asian American population as a whole, nor the populations of their home countries. While 50% of Chinese immigrants in the U.S. have a bachelor's degree, only 5% of the population does in their native China. Lastly, if Confucian culture played a vital part of Asian culture, Chinese immigrant children would perform consistently around the world, yet second-generation Chinese immigrants in Spain are the lowest academic achievers among immigrant groups in the country, and less than half are expected to graduate from middle school.

===== Asian American status in affirmative action =====
In the 1980s, one Ivy League school found evidence it had limited admissions of Asian American students. Because of their high degree of success as a group and over-representation in many areas such as college admissions, most Asian Americans are not granted preferential treatment by affirmative action policies as are other minority groups.

Some schools choose lower-scoring applicants from other racial groups over Asian Americans in an attempt to promote racial diversity and to maintain some proportion to the society's racial demographics. In 2014, American business schools began a process to sort candidates based on their country of origin and region of the world they come from.

=== African Americans ===
Often overlooked is the direct contrast of model minorities with African Americans. It is the opinion of some that model minority stereotypes have historically been utilized to discredit African American racial equality movements, such as the civil rights movement, as they highlighted an alternative route to racial reform. African Americans were pushed to follow the lead of the idea of Asian Americans as the model minority, which was used to highlight that success as a minority was possible through hard work and support of the government. Since the success of Asian Americans was frequently attributed to distinctive cultural elements, researchers and policymakers argued that the struggles faced by African Americans was the result of a "culture of poverty". Thus, politicians such as Assistant Secretary of Labor Daniel Patrick Moynihan suggested that fostering cultural change amongst African Americans was essential to address the overall issue of racial inequality. This is illustrated through Moynihan's paper, "The Negro Family: The Case for National Action", which argues for the need to intervene in African American families in order to establish familial values similar to those of Asian Americans. Other examples where people have been concerned about the potential political weaponization of this idea included Florida governor since 2019 Ron DeSantis proposed mandate for Asian American studies which was criticized by many in the Asian American community for proposing the mandate while simultaneously banning courses on institutionalized racism, one of the fears being the use of Asian American history to promote discrimination against other minorities through an "untruthful representation".

While scholars of the civil rights era relied on cultural values to describe the varying successes of Asian Americans and African Americans, contemporary scholars have begun to examine the effects of the different types of racism the two ethnic groups experience. Essentially, racism in itself is not monolithic. Instead, it is perpetrated in different ways and different avenues of life in which anti-Black rhetoric often proves to be more harmful to Black personhood than situations involving anti-Asian discrimination. Such generalizations regarding Black peoples' inability to thrive in the United States fail to explain the high levels of success seen by Black African and Caribbean immigrants to America which surpasses the averages of all native-born American ethnic groups. Additionally, Black African immigrant women make up the highest paid group of women in country.

=== African immigrants as the invisible model minority ===
African immigrants and Americans born to African immigrants have been described as an "Invisible Model Minority," primarily as a result of a high degree of success in the United States. Due to misconceptions and stereotypes, their success has not been acknowledged by the greater American society, as well as other Western societies, hence the label of "invisible". The invisibility of the success of Africans was touched upon by Dr. Kefa M. Otiso, an academic professor from Bowling Green State University, who stated that, "because these immigrants come from a continent that is often cast in an unfavorable light in the U.S. media, there is a tendency for many Americans to miss the vital contribution of these immigrants to meeting critical U.S. domestic labor needs, enhancing American global economic and technological competitiveness."

==== Education ====
In the 2000 U.S. census, it was revealed that African immigrants were the most educated immigrant group in the United States even when compared to Asian immigrants. Some 48.9% of all African immigrants hold a college diploma. This is more than double the rate of native-born white Americans, and nearly four times the rate of native-born African Americans. According to the 2000 Census, the rate of college diploma acquisition is highest among Egyptian Americans at 59.7%, followed closely by Nigerian Americans at 58.6%.

In 1997, 19.4% of all adult African immigrants in the United States held a graduate degree, compared to 8.1% of adult white Americans and 3.8% of adult Black Americans in the United States. According to the 2000 Census, the percentage of Africans with a graduate degree is highest among Nigerian Americans at 28.3%, followed by Egyptian Americans at 23.8%.

Of the African-born population in the United States age 25 and older, 87.9% reported having a high school degree or higher, compared with 78.8% of Asian-born immigrants and 76.8% of European-born immigrants, respectively. This success comes in spite of facts such as that more than 75% of the African foreign-born in the United States have only arrived since the 1990s and that African immigrants make up a disproportionately small percentage of immigrants coming to the United States such as in 2007 alone African immigrants made up only 3.7% of all immigrants in coming to the United States and again in 2009 they made up only 3.9% of all immigrants making this group a fairly recent to the United States diversity.

Of the 8% of students at Ivy League schools that are Black, a majority, about 50–66%, was made up of Black African immigrants, Caribbean immigrants, and American born to those immigrants. Many top universities report that a disproportionate of the Black student population consists of recent immigrants, their children, or were mixed race.

==== Socioeconomics ====
The overrepresentation of the highly skilled can be seen in the relatively high share of Black African immigrants with at least a four-year college degree. In 2007, 27 percent of the U.S. population aged 25 and older had a four-year degree or more; 10% had a master's, doctorate, or professional degree. Immigrants from several Anglophone African countries were among the best educated: a majority of Black Immigrants from Nigeria, Cameroon, Uganda, Tanzania, and Zimbabwe had at least a four-year degree. Immigrants from Egypt, where the official language is Arabic, were also among the best educated. The overrepresentation of the highly skilled among U.S. immigrants is particularly striking for several of Africa's largest source countries. The United States was the destination for 59% of Nigeria's highly skilled immigrants along with 47% of those from Ghana and 29% from Kenya.

The average annual personal income of African immigrants is about $26,000, nearly $2,000 more than that of workers born in the U.S. This might be because 71% of the Africans 16 years and older are working, compared to 64% of Americans. This is believed to be due larger percentage of African immigrants have higher educational qualifications than Americans, which results in higher per capita incomes for African immigrants and Americans born to African immigrants.

Outside of educational success, specific groups have found economic success and have made many contributions to American society. For example, recent statistics indicate that Ugandan Americans have become one of the country's biggest contributors to the economy, their contribution, amounting to US$1 billion in annual remittances which are disproportionately large contributions despite a community and population of less than 13,000. African immigrants like many other immigrant groups are likely to establish and find success in small businesses. Many Africans that have seen the social and economic stability that comes from ethnic enclaves such as Chinatowns have recently been establishing ethnic enclaves of their own at much higher rates to reap the benefits of such communities. Examples of such ethnic enclaves include Little Ethiopia in Los Angeles and Le Petit Senegal in New York City.

Demographically, African Immigrants and Americans born of African immigrants tend to typically congregate in urban areas, moving to suburban areas over the next few generations as they try to acquire economic and social stability. They are also one of America's least likely groups to live in racially segregated areas. African Immigrants and Americans born of African immigrants have been reported as having some of the lowest crime rates in the United States and being one of the unlikeliest groups to go into or commit crime. African immigrants have even been reported to have lowered crime rates in neighborhoods in which they have moved into.

Black immigrants from Black majority countries are, upon their arrival, revealed to be much healthier than Black people from countries that are not majority Black and where they constitute a minority. Thus, African immigrants are, after arriving, often much healthier than American-born Black people and Black immigrants from Europe, though there is some evidence that as they settle, their health declines to the levels of their native counterparts, suggesting racial discrimination may be a factor in poor health for these communities.

==== Cultural factors ====
Cultural factors have been proposed as an explanation for the success of African immigrants. For example, it is claimed they often integrate into American society more successfully and at higher rates than other immigrants groups due to social factors. One being that many African immigrants have strong English skills even before entering the U.S., many African nations, particularly former Commonwealth nations, use English as a lingua franca. Because of this, many African immigrants to the U.S. are bilingual. Overall, 70% of Black African immigrants either speak English as their primary language or speak another language but are also fluent in English. Compare this to 48% proficiency in English for other immigrant groups.

Kefa M. Otiso has proposed another reason for the success of African immigrants, saying that they have a "high work ethic, focus and a drive to succeed that is honed and crafted by the fact that there are limited socioeconomic opportunities in their native African countries," says Otiso.

==== Selective immigration ====
Another possible cause of the higher performance of African immigrants as a group is that they represent a small population in America so those who are chosen to come here often come from a selective group of African people. The relative difficulty of emigrating and immigrating into the United States has created a selective nature of the process with the U.S. often choosing the wealthier and more educated out of those with less resources, motivation or ability to immigrate.

==== Americans born to African immigrants ====
This pushing of second generation African immigrants by their parents has proven to be the key factor in their success, and a combination of family support and the emphasis of family unit has given these citizens social and psychological stability which makes them strive even further for success in many aspects of their daily life and society.

Many of these American groups have thus transplanted high cultural emphasis on education and work ethic into their cultures which can be seen in the cultures of Algerian Americans, Kenyan Americans, Sierra Leonean Americans, Ghanaian Americans, Malawian Americans, Congolese Americans, Tanzanian Americans, and especially Nigerian Americans and Egyptian Americans. Though this fails to explain why poverty, corruption, violence, ethnic conflict, and generally poor socioeconomic conditions continue to plague African nations such as Nigeria.

=== Caribbean Americans ===
In 2017, there were approximately 4.4 million Caribbean immigrants in the US. Overall, there are over 8 million people of Caribbean heritage. Cubans, Dominicans, Jamaicans, Haitians, Trinidadians and Tobagonians are the largest groups. Caribbeans are likely to be employed at the same rate as the general immigrant population and at a higher rate than native born Americans. According to a report in the International Business Times, Caribbean immigrants perform better than the general immigrant population in terms of high school graduation rates and some socio-economic indicators. In comparison to other immigrant groups, Caribbeans are far more likely to be naturalised American citizens, display a better standard of English and have higher rates of health insurance cover. Studies by Harvard sociologist Robert Sampson suggest Caribbean immigrants are associated with low crime rates. According to a report drawn from Immigration Studies (CIS), various Caribbean communities are among the top immigrant homeowners in America. The non-Hispanic Caribbean community tend to earn more than the American average. In 2018, their median household income was $57, 339 compared to the American average of $54, 689. In 2019, the figure was $60, 997 compared to the American average of $57, 761 (US Census Bureau 2018 and 2019). Caribbeans make up the majority of America's Black immigrant population (46%). Black immigrants significantly contribute to the U.S. economy, with a spending power of $98 billion in 2018. Black immigrants earned approximately $133.6 billion and paid $36 billion in US taxes. These successes are primarily why some Caribbean Americans have been described as a model minority.

=== Cuban success story ===
The Cuban success story is a popular myth that Cuban Americans are all political exiles who have become wealthy in the United States. This story is often used to prove the accessibility of the American dream.

== Commonwealth countries ==
=== Africans ===
Higher educated or skilled African immigrants are attracted to the United States, Canada and Australia more than Europe.

In the United Kingdom, one report has revealed that African immigrants have high rates of employment and that African immigrants are doing better economically than some other immigrant groups. Africans have obtained much success as entrepreneurs, many owning and starting many successful businesses across the country. Of the African immigrants, certain groups have become and are highly integrated into the country especially groups which have strong English language skills such as Zimbabweans or Nigerians, and they often come from highly educated and highly qualified backgrounds. Many African immigrants have low levels of unemployment, and some groups are known for their high rates of self-employment, as can be seen in the case of Nigerian immigrants. Certain groups outside of having strong English skills have found success mostly because many who immigrated to the UK are already highly educated and highly skilled professionals who come with jobs and positions such as business people, academics, traders, doctors and lawyers as is the case with Sudanese immigrants.

As of 2013, Nigerian immigrants were among the nine immigrant populations that were above average academically in the UK. Euromonitor International for the British Council suggests that Nigerian students' high academic achievement largely stems from most pupils having already learned English in their home country. Additionally, many hail from wealthier segments of Nigerian society and can afford to pursue studies abroad. A notable example of educated British Nigerians is the case of Paula and Peter Imafidon,, nine-year-old twins who are the youngest students admitted to high school in England. Nicknamed the 'Wonder Twins', the twins and other members of their family have accomplished rare feats, passing advanced examinations and gaining admission into institutions with students twice their age.

=== Asians ===
In Canada, Asian Canadians are viewed as a model minority, which whether seen as a 'positive' or 'negative' supports the stereotype of Asian Canadians as solely driven by professional and economic success, dehumanizing them in comparison to other groups. The majority of this is aimed toward the East Asian and South Asian communities.

In New Zealand, an analysis of news media indicated Chinese New Zealanders are not viewed as a model minority.

== China ==
=== Hakka people ===
Despite their relatively small numbers, the Hakkas are believed to have played an outsized role in shaping the course of modern Chinese and overseas Chinese history, particularly as a source of revolutionary, political, military leaders, as well as presidents, prime ministers. Overseas Hakkas have distinguished themselves not only in politics but also in business, academia, and other fields in their adopted countries. Many have become leading figures in national governments or Chinese diaspora communities, with several rising to the position of head of state. Others have built influential careers as entrepreneurs, scholars, and community leaders.

== Egypt ==
=== Egyptian Copts ===
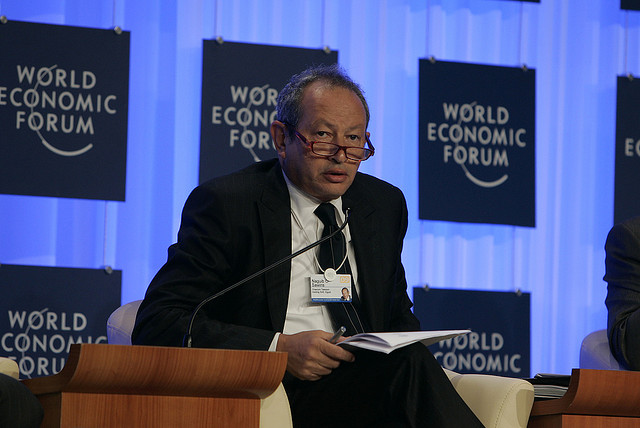
Naguib Sawiris is an Egyptian Coptic billionaire businessman.

In Egypt, Copts have relatively higher educational attainment, relatively higher wealth index, and a stronger representation in white collar job types, but limited representation in security agencies. The majority of demographic, socioeconomic and health indicators are similar among Copts and Muslims. Historically; many Copts were accountants, and in 1961 Coptic Christians owned 51% of the Egyptian banks. A Pew Center study about religion and education around the world in 2016, found that around 36% of Egyptian Christians obtain a university degree in institutions of higher education.

According to the scholar Andrea Rugh Copts tend to belong to the educated middle and upper-middle class, and according to scholar Lois Farag "The Copts still played the major role in managing Egypt's state finances. They held 20% of total state capital, 45% of government employment, and 45% of government salarie". According to scholar J. D. Pennington 45% of the medical doctors, 60% of the pharmacists of Egypt were Christians.

A number of Coptic business and land-owning families became very wealthy and influential such as the Egyptian Coptic Christian Sawiris family that owns the Orascom conglomerate, spanning telecommunications, construction, tourism, industries and technology. In 2008, Forbes estimated the family's net worth at $36 billion. According to scholars Maristella Botticini and Zvi Eckstein argue that Copts have relatively higher educational attainment and relatively higher wealth index, due to Coptic Christianity emphasis on literacy and that Coptic Christianity encouraged the accumulation of human capital.

== France ==
=== French Vietnamese ===
The Vietnamese in France are the most well-established overseas Vietnamese community outside eastern Asia, as well as Asian ethnic group in France, with roughly 139,000 Vietnamese immigrants living in France. While the level of integration among immigrants and their place in society have become prominent issues in France in the past decade, French media and politicians generally view the Vietnamese community as having a high degree of integration within French society, in addition to their economic and academic success. A survey in 1988 asking French citizens which immigrant ethnic group they believe to be the most integrated in French society saw the Vietnamese ranked fourth, behind only the Italian, Spanish and Portuguese communities.

The educational attainment rate of the Vietnamese population in France is the highest among overseas Vietnamese populations, a legacy that dates back to the colonial era of Vietnam, when privileged families and those with connections to the colonial government often sent their children to France to study. In addition to high achievement in education, the Vietnamese population in France is also largely successful economically. When the first major wave of Vietnamese migrants arrived in France during World War I, a number of migrants already held professional occupations in their new country shortly after their arrival. More recently, refugees who arrived in France after the Fall of Saigon are often more financially stable than their counterparts who settled in North America, Australia and the rest of Europe, due to better linguistic and cultural knowledge of the host country, which allowed them to enter the education system and/or higher paying professions with little trouble. Within a single generation, the median income for French-born Vietnamese has risen above the French median income.

=== French Laotians ===
Similarly to the Vietnamese, the Laotian community in France is one of the most well-integrated into the country and is the most established overseas Laotian populace. Unlike their counterparts in North America and Australia, Laotians in France have a high rate of educational success and are well-represented in the academic and professional sectors, especially among the generations of French-born Lao. Due to better linguistic and cultural knowledge of the host country, Laotian immigrants to France, who largely came as refugees after the end of the Laotian Civil War, were able to assimilate at a high rate.

=== Criticism ===
According to the French antiracist activist Grace Ly, the model minority myth is associated with the South-East Asian community in France. Ly denounces the positive stereotypes associated with the Asian community in France in her book Model Young Girl (Jeune fille modèle). Notably in France, however, the persistent official policy of "color blindness" makes the concept of minorities, and policies to counter racism, different in modern French culture from America and the UK. This however, is and should be considered as distinct from actual expressions of prejudice in France, regardless of official policy.

== Germany ==
In Germany the academic success of people of Vietnamese origin has been called "Das vietnamesische Wunder"("The Vietnamese Miracle"). A study revealed that in the Berlin districts of Lichtenberg and Marzahn, both in former East Berlin and possessing a relatively small percentage of immigrants, Vietnamese account for only 2% of the general population, but make up 17% of the prep school population. Another note of Vietnamese Germans' academic success is that even though they can grow up in poverty in places like East Germany, they usually outperform their peers by a wide margin.

Another group in Germany that is extremely academically successful and is comparable to that of a model minority are Korean Germans, 70% of whom attended a Gymnasium (which is comparable to a prep school in American society), compared to Vietnamese Germans with only 50% attending a Gymnasium. Also, over 70% of second-generation Korean Germans hold at least an Abitur or higher educational qualification, more than twice the ratio of the rest of Germany.

== Israel ==
In Israel, Christian Arabs are one of the most educated groups. Maariv has described the Christian Arab sectors as "the most successful in education system," since Christian Arabs fared the best in terms of education in comparison to any other group receiving an education in Israel and they have attained a bachelor's degree and academic degree more than the median Israeli population.

=== Education ===
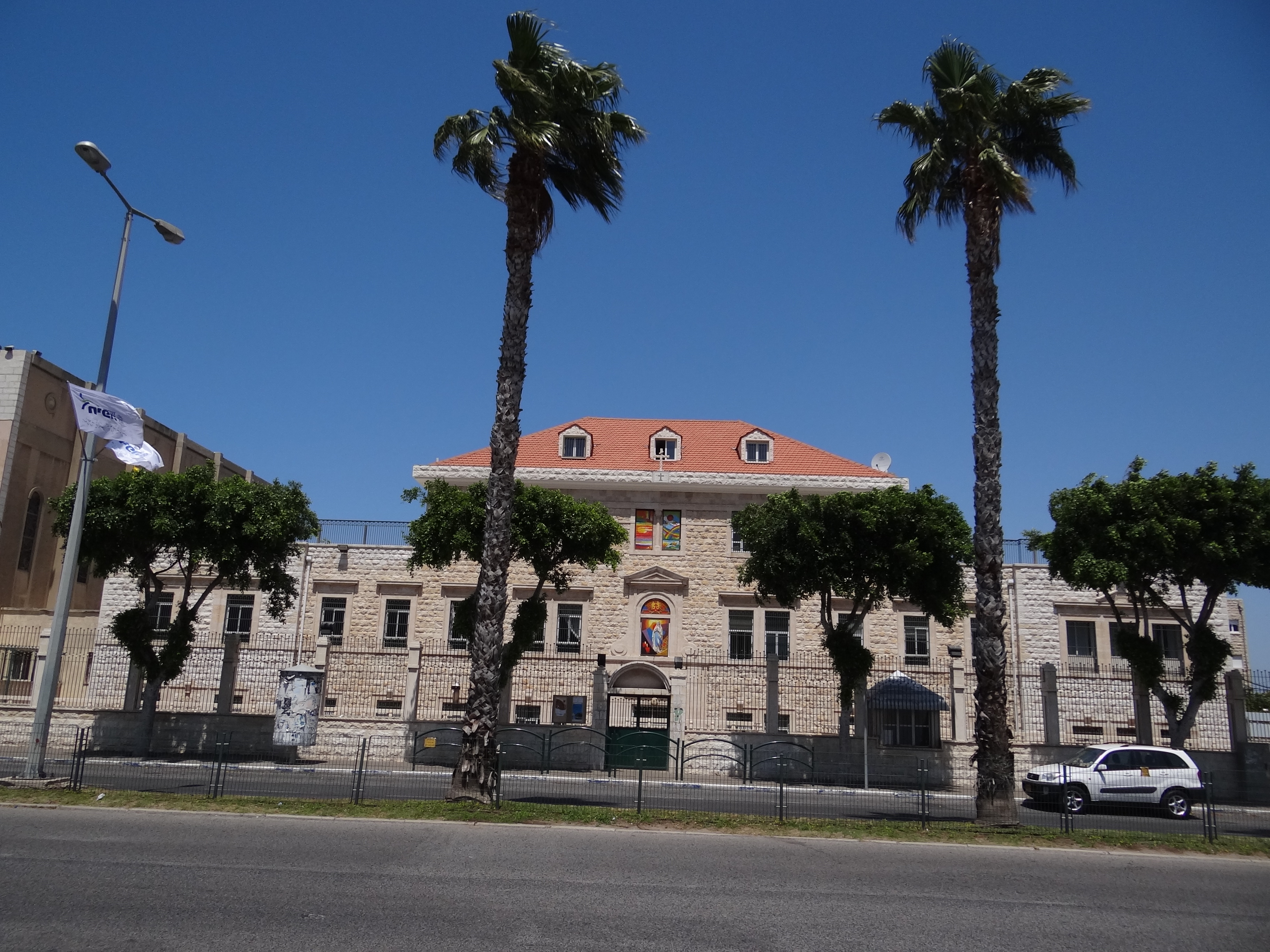
Catholic school in Haifa: High level Christian schools are among Israel's best performing educational institutions.

According to the study "Are Christian Arabs the New Israeli Jews? Reflections on the Educational Level of Arab Christians in Israel" by Hanna David from the University of Tel Aviv, one of the factors why Israeli Arab Christians are the most educated segment of Israel's population is the high level of the Christian educational institutions. Christian schools in Israel are among the best schools in the country, and while those schools represent only 4% of the Arab schooling sector, about 34% of Arab university students come from Christian schools, and about 87% of the Israeli Arabs in the high tech sector have been educated in Christian schools. A 2011 Maariv article described the Christian Arab sector as "the most successful in the education system," an opinion supported by the Israel Central Bureau of Statistics and others who point out that Christian Arabs fared best in terms of education in comparison to any other group receiving an education in Israel.

=== High school and matriculation exams ===
The Israel Central Bureau of Statistics noted that when taking into account the data recorded over the years, Christian Arabs fared the best in terms of education in comparison to any other group receiving an education in Israel. In 2016 Christian Arabs had the highest rates of success at matriculation examinations, namely 73.9%, both in comparison to Muslim and Druze Israelis (41% and 51.9% respectively), and to the students from the different branches of the Hebrew (majority Jewish) education system considered as one group (55.1%).

=== Higher education ===
Arab Christians are one of the most educated groups in Israel. Statistically, Arab Christians in Israel have the highest rates of educational attainment among all religious communities, according to a data by Israel Central Bureau of Statistics in 2010, 63% of Israeli Arab Christians have had college or postgraduate education, the highest of any religious and ethno-religious group. Despite the fact that Arab Christians only represent 2.1% of the total Israeli population, in 2014 they accounted for 17.0% of the country's university students, and for 14.4% of its college students. There are more Christians who have attained a bachelor's degree or higher academic degrees than the median Israeli population.

The rate of students studying in the field of medicine was higher among Arab Christian students than that of all other sectors. and the percentage of Arab Christian women who are receiving higher education is also higher than that of other groups.

In 2013, Arab Christian students were also the vanguard in terms of eligibility for higher education, as the Christian Arab students had the highest rates of receiving Psychometric Entrance Test scores which eligible them to be accepted into universities, data from the Israel Central Bureau of Statistics show that 61% of Christian Arabs were eligible for university studies, compared to 50% of Jewish, 45% of Druze, and 35% of Muslim students.

=== Socio-economic ===
In terms of their socio-economic situation, Arab Christians are more similar to the Jewish population than to the Muslim Arab population. They have the lowest incidence of poverty and the lowest percentage of unemployment which is 4.9% compared to 6.5% among Jewish men and women. They have also the highest median household income among Arab citizens of Israel and second highest median household income among the Israeli ethno-religious groups. Also Arab Christians have a high presentation in science and in the white-collar professions. In Israel Arab Christians are portrayed as a hard working and upper middle class educated ethno-religious minority.

== Mexico ==
Due to their business success and cultural assimilation, German Mexicans and Lebanese Mexicans are seen as model minorities in Mexico. More recently, Haitians in Tijuana have been seen favorably by Tijuanenses as model immigrants due to their work ethic and integration into Tijuana society, and have been contrasted with Central American migrants.

In the 19th and early 20th century, German immigration was encouraged due to the perceived industriousness of Germans. German Mexicans were instrumental in the development of the cheese and brewing industries in Mexico. Germans in the Soconusco were successful in the coffee industry.

Although Lebanese Mexicans made up less than 5% of the total immigrant population in Mexico during the 1930s, they constituted half of the immigrant economic activity. Carlos Slim, one of the richest individuals in the world, is the topmost example of Lebanese Mexican success.

== Netherlands ==
=== Background ===
At the end of the colonial era of the Dutch East Indies (now: Indonesia), a community of about 300,000 Indo-Europeans (people of mixed Indonesian and European heritage) was registered as Dutch citizens. Indos formed the vast majority of the European legal class in the colony. When in the second half of the 20th century the independent Republic of Indonesia was established, the majority of Europeans, including the Indo-Europeans, were expelled from the newly established country.

=== Repatriation ===
From 1945 to 1949 the Indonesian National Revolution turned the former Dutch East Indies into an increasingly hostile environment for Indo-Europeans. Violence aimed towards Indo-Europeans during its early Bersiap period (1945–1946) accumulated in almost 20,000 deaths. The Indo diaspora continued up to 1964 and resulted in the emigration of practically all Indo-Europeans from a turbulent young Indonesian nation. Even though most Indos had never set foot in the Netherlands before, this emigration was named repatriation.

Notwithstanding the fact that Indos in the former colony of the Dutch East Indies were officially part of the European legal class and were formally considered to be Dutch nationals, the Dutch government practiced an official policy of discouragement with regard to the post-WWII repatriation of Indos to the Netherlands. While Dutch policy was in fact aimed at stimulating Indos to give up Dutch citizenship and opt for Indonesian citizenship, simultaneously the young Indonesian Republic implemented policies increasingly intolerant towards anything remotely reminiscent of Dutch influence. Even though actual aggression against Indos decreased after the extreme violence of the Bersiap period, all Dutch (language) institutions, schools and businesses were gradually eliminated and public discrimination and racism against Indos in the Indonesian job market continued. In the end 98% of the original Indo community repatriated to their distant fatherland in Europe.

=== Integration ===
In the 1990s and early 21st century the Netherlands was confronted with ethnic tension in a now multi-cultural society. Ethnic tensions, rooted in the perceived lack of social integration and rise of crime rates of several ethnic minorities, climaxed with the murders of politician Pim Fortuyn in 2002 and film director Theo van Gogh in 2004. In 2006 statistics show that in Rotterdam, the second largest city in the country, close to 50% of the inhabitants were of foreign descent. The Indo community however is considered the best integrated ethnic and cultural minority in the Netherlands. Statistical data compiled by the CBS shows that Indos belong to the group with the lowest crime rates in the country.

A CBS study of 1999 reveals that of all foreign born groups living in the Netherlands, only the Indos have an average income similar to that of citizens born in the Netherlands. Job participation in government, education and health care is similar as well. Another recent CBS study, among foreign born citizens and their children living in the Netherlands in 2005, shows that on average, Indos own the largest number of independent enterprises. A 2007 CBS study shows that already over 50% of first-generation Indos have married a native born Dutch person. A percentage that increased to 80% for the second generation. One of the first and oldest Indo organisations that supported the integration of Indo repatriates into the Netherlands is the Pelita foundation.

Although Indo repatriates, being born overseas, are officially registered as Dutch citizens of foreign descent, their Eurasian background puts them in the Western sub-class instead of the Non-Western (Asian) sub-class.

Two factors are usually attributed to the essence of their apparently seamless assimilation into Dutch society: Dutch citizenship and the amount of 'Dutch cultural capital', in the form of school attainments and familiarity with the Dutch language and culture, that Indos already possessed before migrating to the Netherlands.

=== New generations ===
Although third- and fourth-generation Indos are part of a fairly large minority community in the Netherlands, the path of assimilation ventured by their parents and grandparents has left them with little knowledge of their actual roots and history, even to the point that they find it hard to recognise their own cultural features. Some Indos find it hard to grasp the concept of their Eurasian identity and either tend to disregard their Indonesian roots or on the contrary attempt to profile themselves as Indonesian. In recent years however the reinvigorated search for roots and identity has also produced several academic studies.

== Criticism ==
=== Scholarly critiques ===
Because the model minority myth suggests that those designated as model minorities, such as Asian Americans, are a homogenous group characterized by a singular conception of educational and occupational success, critics of the model minority myth argue that it oversimplifies complex issues of race, class, and discrimination, and ignores the many obstacles that Asian Americans and other minority groups face. This can lead to a neglect of policies and programs that address systemic barriers of success and can also contribute to inter-minority tensions and further discrimination.

For instance, some scholars argue that the model minority myth has been used as a tool to assist the advancement of color-blind ideologies and agendas within politics that argue against the existence of racial oppression or its alleged impact on economic outcomes, and reinforce the attainability of the American Dream. By using the model minority myth as a tool to perpetuate the American Dream and blame other people of color for their own struggles, critics of the model minority myth worry that it could erode support for government assistance programs.

Additionally, many critics of the model minority myth argue that the model minority myth masks intra-group inequality. For Asian Americans, a common criticism is that their classification as a model minority obstructs the diversity that encompasses an Asian American identity and the inequalities experienced across Asian Americans. Asian Americans belong to more than twenty-four distinct ethnic groups, with distinct cultures. Even within a specific ethnic group, there are significant differences in religious practices, socioeconomic status, political affiliation, and much more. The reality is that many Asian American groups face discrimination and poverty, with particular Asian American groups, such as Cambodian Americans and Hmong Americans, having poverty rates higher than that of European Americans.

Critics of the model minority myth also argue that the model minority myth leads those in the dominant group, like White Americans, to believe that racism against the model minority, like Asian Americans, does not exist. This can perpetuate the belief that Asian Americans do not need resources nor support, and delegitimize their voiced struggles. As such, a study conducted by McGowan and Lindgren found that those who view Asian Americans as hard working and intelligent are more likely to believe that Asian Americans face little discrimination in areas such as job recruitment and housing, demonstrating how positive perceptions of the model minority myth could impact an individual's ability to recognize and support instances of socioeconomic inequality. Affirmative action policies that exclude Asian Americans due to their incorrectly perceived universally high rates of educational and occupational attainment are another commonly cited example used to illustrate how the model minority myth can further perpetuate social and economic inequalities.

The model minority myth is also commonly criticized for serving as a tool that divides racial minorities to ultimately maintain systemic White supremacy. Scholars such as Claire Jean Kim have described this dynamic through the concept of racial triangulation, where Asian Americans are valorized relative to Black communities yet simultaneously positioned as perpetual foreigners in relation to White Americans. By applying critical race theory, scholars have examined how the model minority myth fits into broader racial dynamics within the United States. Application of critical race theory has classified model minorities as examples of middleman minorities. Middleman minorities are often granted economic privileges but no political privileges, leading to tension and hostility from the elites and the masses they are situated between. Coupled with an understanding that the model minority term was historically and is still especially attributed to Asian Americans, applying the middleman minority theory to the use of the model minority term places Asian Americans in a racial bind between White Americans and other people of color. In this arrangement, the model minority term serves to present Asian Americans as self-sufficient and high achieving, whose stereotype of success is used to maintain White dominance by blaming other people of color for their struggles and to distract individuals from noticing and criticizing systems of White dominance. Beyond being used by the dominant upper class as a political tool, the model minority myth has also been internalized by many Asian Americans and Asians, who come to see society as fair and meritocratic. As a result, those who internalize this belief are more likely to hold anti-Black attitudes and oppose policies aimed at advancing racial equality, attributing other marginalized groups’ struggles to individual failure rather than systemic barriers.

Despite widespread scholarly criticism of the model minority myth as a racialized and harmful stereotype, its influence continues to persist in media, education, and policy discourse. Academically, the myth has been widely discredited for obscuring structural inequalities and reinforcing anti-Blackness, but in practice, it is still frequently invoked—both implicitly and explicitly—when portraying Asian American communities as exceptionally successful or culturally predisposed to achievement. Contemporary journalism has echoed these concerns, pointing out that the myth continues to be perpetuated in stories about Asian American academic performance and professional success, while masking issues such as mental health struggles, poverty, and discrimination faced by subgroups within the Asian diaspora.

For example, a 2020 NPR feature explained how the model minority stereotype undermines efforts to address Asian Americans’ healthcare and economic needs by making their struggles less visible to policymakers. Similarly, a Guardian article described how the myth pressures Asian Australians to conform to rigid standards of “quiet success” while discouraging open discussion of racism. These critiques emphasize that while the model minority narrative is often deployed under the guise of praise, it continues to function as a tool of erasure, contributing to the marginalization of less privileged Asian communities and reinforcing racial hierarchies.

== See also ==
- Bamboo ceiling
- Benevolent prejudice
- Barua (Bangladesh)
- Bengali Christians
- Chinese Exclusion Act
- Dominant minority
- Global majority
- Honorary whites
- Honorary Aryan
- Intergroup anxiety
- Immigration and Nationality Act of 1965
- John Henryism
- Jewish stereotypes
- Middleman minority
- Minority stress
- Oppression Olympics
- Overachievement
- Parsis (India)
- Race and intelligence
- Stereotype threat
- Tiger mother
- The miller, his son and the donkey
- World on Fire (book)
- Victim blaming
