= Covert racism =

Type of racist behavior

Covert racism is a form of racial discrimination that is disguised and subtle, rather than public or obvious. Concealed in the fabric of society, covert racism discriminates against individuals through often evasive or seemingly passive methods. Covert, racially biased decisions are often hidden or rationalized with an explanation that society is more willing to accept. These racial biases cause a variety of problems that serve to empower the suppressors while diminishing the rights and powers of the oppressed. Covert racism often works subliminally, and much of the discrimination is done subconsciously.

== History in the U.S. ==
With the history of racial inequality in the United States, racism has long been an issue. The enslavement of millions of blacks along with the huge influx of immigrants throughout its history resulted in great diversity but also racial segregation. With the abolition of slavery, different forms of segregation were implemented, including Jim Crow laws and later American social and political structures, which led to segregation within cities and the suburbanization of the working and middle classes. As overt racial discrimination became illegal and less apparent, the idea of the nation homogenizing became popular. As the U.S. accepted more immigrants from different cultures, various "melting pots" of unity were seen to arise. Along with this, ideologies posited that every group of immigrants goes through the same discrimination. Many groups eventually assimilate, but racism still exists, often in different forms and to different degrees.

When black G.I.s returned home from the Vietnam War, they were denied the money promised to them to support their education and help them buy homes. While only 9.5% of soldiers serving in Vietnam were black, they comprised nearly 20% of front-line troops and 25% or more of airborne divisions. Black servicemen were twice as likely to re-enlist in the Navy, Marine Corps, and Air Force and three times as likely to re-enlist in the Army as their white counterparts, not for any sense of adventure but because they found the monetary rewards to be promising and they were treated more equally.

=== De cardio racism ===
De cardio racism is a term coined by John L. Jackson Jr. Jackson states that the rise of de cardio racism can be traced to the aftermath of the legislative and political success of the Civil Rights Movement. Those obvious victories, he suggests, did not lead the US into a racial color-blind society but rather shifted racist beliefs to the "hearts" of Americans. To Jackson, this reimagines the manifestation of racism—away from blatant Jim Crow-era discrimination and towards covert, deniable subtleties. Jackson argues, "De cardio racism is about what the law can't touch, what won't be easily proved or disproved, what can't be simply criminalized and deemed unconstitutional. It is racism that is most terrifying because it is hidden, secret, papered over with public niceties and politically correct jargon." In this new era, Jackson states that we must develop new tools to detect racial dog whistles and to penetrate the "hearts" of those who harbor racist beliefs without becoming distracted by empty rhetoric. As compared to the past, where activists confronted a clear and tangible discriminatory foe, Jackson states that modern activists must contend with an opponent parroting the rhetoric of racial equality but not backing it up with any action. The racism is hidden, covert, and tucked away in a part of Americans' hearts that is hard to reach. He argues that they must navigate the head-scratching silence of white Americans who engaged in violent racist attacks just a generation ago. In Jackson's words, "De Cardio Racism asks: where did all of yesterday's racial wolves go, and why do all these sheep seem to be standing around licking their chops?"

=== De facto racism ===
De facto racism refers to racism "in fact", or as a matter of circumstance and personal choice. In the post-Civil Rights Era, governments and institutions could no longer overtly discriminate based on race in law, regulation, or policy. Modern de facto racism refers to forms of discrimination that may not be overt but still produce disparate outcomes. Pertinent examples include continued school segregation. Although de jure racist practices of housing segregation were outlawed by the passage of the 1968 Fair Housing Act, de facto racist practices such as "redlining" and "white flight" largely trapped black households in the inner cities and saw white families move to the suburbs. Other de facto racist policies, like basing school funding off property taxes, have led to disparate investment in public schools.

De facto racism can also exist as the lingering remnants of centuries of de jure racism. Past generations of black families' inability to become homeowners or attend well-funded schools has hindered long-term social mobility. As a result, black families are not able to cultivate generational wealth or pass on social or cultural capital to their children. This has led to a persistent wealth gap between black and white families. In 2022, white households held on average $252,000 more than the average black family.

== Colonialism ==
After the departure of Western imperial powers from their former colonies, many nations in the Global South were left with odious debt, crumbling institutions, economic decline, and a social morass. No longer in control of their former colonies, some people in the West looked for ways to explain the lasting impact of their colonial rule. Covert concepts that blamed the culture of former colonies replaced clear, moral, and scientific boundaries between the colonizers and colonies. Notable examples include "cultural deficits" and "deficient human capital". To explain this rhetoric, some scholars argue that the moral separation did not go away but changed forms as fatalistic concepts like a "culture of poverty" turned attention away from structural inequities left from colonial rule and put the onus on former colonies.

=== White savior complex ===
Enlightenment colonialism refers to a set of cultural norms that served as a justification for colonial rule. Enlightenment colonialism comes from the philosophy of the White Man's Burden and the supposed moral responsibility of white people to "save" the "uncivilized" people in the Global South. The fundamental premise rests on the cultural inferiority of former colonies compared to the "civilized" culture of Western powers. Economic exploitation, slavery, and oppression were justified by the promise of introducing the tenets of a "civilized society" as defined by the fundamental elements of Western culture.

Emerging from decades of Enlightenment colonialism came the white savior complex. Although "white saviors" may not overtly impose Western cultural norms, what is similar about both philosophies is the premise of cultural inferiority and the erasure of the agency of former colonies. White Saviorism assumes that the people impacted by the problem, usually in developing nations, are incapable of creating their own solutions and that white people must intervene to save them. Critics of white saviorism argue that it perpetuates a subtle dependency from the survivor to the savior. Developing countries become reliant on charity from Western charities, which puts the recipient in a subservient position to the giver. White saviors have also been criticized for prioritizing their values over the experience of the local community. However, many argue that Western charity is a net good and that it is the responsibility of wealthy nations in the west to support low-income nations in the global south. Nonetheless, many developmental economists have pointed out the tangible importance of including the community in humanitarian solutions.

== Language ==
Covert racism in language, or coded racism, is the deployment of common stereotypes or tropes to elucidate a racially charged idea. Rather than expressly perpetuating racist tropes, covert linguistic racism is seen as rational or "common sense", and many are not aware of its impact. The term microaggressions has been used to describe the deployment of covert racism in language that usually represents an unconscious bias. The term was invented by Chester M. Pierce in 1970 to describe insults he witnessed non-black Americans inflicting on black students. Although the speaker does not state an expressed racial opinion, they often reinforce stereotypes that make the recipient feel outside the norm; a recipient of a microaggression feels as though their individuality becomes lost to an underlying stereotype. Notable examples include asking a person of color where they learned to speak English or presuming that a black person is dangerous. In all cases, the speaker generalizes or idealizes a quality that simultaneously degrades a minority group. However, some scholars have criticized the term for its lack of scientific evidence, reliance on subjective evidence, and elevation of victimhood by focusing on a term connoting harm.

=== Racial stereotypes ===
Racial or cultural stereotyping refers to generalizing a group based on a simplified set of norms, behaviors, or characteristics. Although stereotypes can take on positive or negative connotations, they can be intrinsically harmful. The three main arguments are that they reduce an individual to a set of oversimplified characteristics, leave no room for change, and insist the stereotypes are natural and/or biological. Some scholars suggest that stereotyping is a method to reinforce entrenched power structures by making arbitrary social divisions seem "natural" and inevitable. Stereotypes also erase one's individuality and impose rigid norms, leading to frequent tension between one's identity and their perceived social role.

Racial stereotypes have been a powerful tool to lock people of color out of valuable socioeconomic resources, oftentimes inflicting self-destructive behavior. A 2010 study found that victims of stereotyping were more likely to be aggressive, lack self-control, and overindulge in carbohydrate-heavy foods. Furthermore, there is also research showing that individuals who are stereotyped are more likely to behave according to the stereotype, further reinforcing its validity and increasing its pull on targeted groups.

The data around racial stereotypes paints a clear picture of their pervasiveness and utility among white people against people of color. A study by Laura Green of Virginia Commonwealth University showed that 58.9 percent of black and white subjects endorsed at least one stereotypical difference in inborn ability. Additionally, whites are 10 times more likely to be seen as superior in artistic ability and abstract thinking ability, and African-Americans are 10 times more likely to be seen as superior in athletic ability and rhythmic ability. Further, 49 percent of subjects endorsed stereotypical differences in physical characteristics, such as blacks experience less physical pain than whites and have thicker skulls and skin.

== Within politics ==
Covert racism within politics can be observed in various ways. The process begins with the demonization of certain ethnic groups by associating them with a negative aspect of society, which can be called racialization. Politicians can then perpetuate these negative associations to promote fear of a race and, in turn, offer protection through policy. This strategy is not new to the 20th century and can be observed globally. The way in which politicians throughout history have used covert racism tactically to promote their own agenda is through media outlets. Covert racism in politics has also been deployed to define ethnic groups as monoliths. Political parties define broad-based and universal narratives to appeal to a specific racial voting block. Critics argue that this approach prioritizes stereotypes about the community rather than appealing to their diverse ideological backgrounds. Some individuals have reported feeling taken for granted by politicians because they are assumed to vote a particular way based on their race.

=== Dog whistling ===
Dog whistling refers to racially coded political messaging that disparages or warns about specific social groups. The term derives from a physical "dog whistle"—an instrument that produces a sound undetectable to humans but bothersome to dogs. Likewise, what makes a dog whistle covert is that it does not expressly state a racist idea but a coded racial message that maintains a sense of plausible deniability. Compared to other forms of coded racism in language, a dog whistle usually has an expressed political goal. Most often, it is used as a method of fearmongering to drive voter turnout or advocate for specific policies.

=== "Thugs" ===
One way in which politicians use covert racism is with keywords like "thugs". Globally, the term thugs has become synonymous with young black people, with its roots in the Hindi language, where the word was used in association with "scoundrel" or "a deceiver". The term is often used to describe a thief or deviant. Thugs are usually closely associated with violence, gangs, and crime. The word gained popularity in the black community and mainstream culture during the rise of rap in the 80s and 90s and the War on Crime. In the era of political dog whistles, many world leaders used the term to disparage criminals and castigate the black community. Some recent examples are the usage of the word "thugs" when describing Afro-Trinidadian impoverished males in the ports of Spain, President Donald Trump describing protestors as "thugs" following the murder of George Floyd, and Prime Minister Boris Johnson responding to the George Floyd protests by saying "racist thuggery" will be answered by "the force of law". Other words like ghetto, hood, and sketchy are used by politicians in a similar way to represent blackness without explicitly stating it.

== Police ==
Covert racism in policing refers to the subtle and often unconscious biases that police officers may hold towards people of certain racial or ethnic groups. Many scholars argue that covert racism in policing persists as modern police forces move away from openly racist practices. Covert racial disparities in policing are seen in various ways, including by surveilling a perimeter, searching individuals, and conducting traffic stops across the United States. For example, a research team at Stanford University compiled and analyzed a dataset of nearly 100 million traffic stops. They found that after sunset, the "veil of darkness" resulted in black drivers being stopped fewer times than before sunset. Their findings indicated that police stops and search decisions were affected by racial biases. Stop and frisk has also been defined as a form of covert racism in policing. Although many police departments use stop and frisk, the NYPD came under intense scrutiny for its tactics in the mid-2000s. Critics claim that stop and frisk led to the explicit targeting of young men of color by the police. At its peak in 2011, the NYPD reported making nearly 700,000 stops. A disproportionate number of the stops were targeted towards young men of color—over 90%, with over 70% later being found innocent. The use of stop and frisk was deemed unconstitutional in 2013 by a New York court. However, many police officers argue that there have been substantive steps to root out racist practices. Chairs of the UK Black Police Associations stated that "open expressions of racism" have largely disappeared. The New York City Police Department and other departments have also shifted to community-based policing models, hiring more officers of color and imposing implicit-bias training to root out racial tendencies.

Some argue that covert racism manifests in how police officers are treated within the department. There is evidence that many minority officers are eliminated during initial training, given assignments that do not advance their careers, and even given unjust evaluations and discipline.

== Media ==
=== Political advertising ===
Covert racism in political advertising can take the form of racial priming or racial cues, which is when political leaders speak about certain topics and subtly link them to racial groups without explicitly referencing race. These cues bypass any conscious thought of race or racism and therefore do not explicitly violate the 'norm of equality'. Some examples include Ronald Reagan nurturing implicit ties between subjects such as 'big government' with the demands of minorities for equality to imply that they were asking for special treatment, or George Bush's "Revolving Door" advertisement that included a photo of Willie Norton, said to strengthen subtle ties between black people and increasing crime rates. These strategies can have the potential to simplify political decision-making by activating racial thinking as a vital factor.

Both anger and fear have been proposed as the emotional responses that prompt racial thinking in the viewers of these kinds of political advertisements, with fear stemming from white people having to share resources they see as scarce with minorities or anger that manifests as blaming minorities for social issues.

Even in more recent US elections, racial cues can be seen in political advertising. Some examples include Mitt Romney's 'Obama isn't Working' slogan in the 2012 elections, emphasizing the implicit use of the stereotype of black people being lazy to undermine Barack Obama's campaign and black people in general and imply that they were gaining advantages at the expense of white people. However, in research surrounding race and the 2016 elections, some findings observe that more explicit racism, as opposed to implicit racial cues, has become more effective in driving white voters' choices.

=== News ===
One way covert racism in the news has been said to manifest is as "white normative objectivity". White normative objectivity is described as centering the white lens when reporting about marginalized communities, reinforcing stereotypes, and downplaying the effects of structural racism. Scholars have observed that it can emphasize the otherness of communities of color through stories chosen for shock value or sensation while ignoring the humanity of these communities. White normative objectivity has also been criticized for embracing a form of neutrality, or "both-sides-ism", that obscures harm from dominant society by individualizing institutional inequalities and lacking any critique of power dynamics that historically favor white people. The Missouri School of Journalism outlined several criticisms of news coverage of minorities, saying that most news channels do not show people of color within the context of their communities, portray them as either enablers, criminals, or victims, and do not show how the entire community is impacted by the crime. Furthermore, there is an overemphasis on atypical behavior that portrays communities of color in a constant state of crisis and not enough coverage of the average day-to-day lifestyles in their communities.

Covert racism has also been said to manifest in the lack of diversity within the newsroom, with a 2022 survey saying that 52% of US journalists think their newsroom lacks racial diversity. Though minorities are not legally barred from the newsroom, many diversity surveys of newsrooms show that white men are still disproportionately represented both as journalists and as higher management, seeing as in 2017, it was found that minorities only made up about 16.55% of the workforce in news media organizations, and 85.1% of TV news directors were white. Retention of minority reporters is also still an issue. Many reporters of color cite the lack of diversity as negatively affecting their time in the newsroom, with many speaking about their experience with microaggressions, a lack of promotions, and pay gaps.

The manner in which racism is discussed in news coverage can also contribute to the "debatability" or "plausible deniability" of racism. Currently, overt forms of racism are looked down upon in greater society, so criticizing minority groups usually happens within coded language and actions that can be denied to be truly racist. In covering stories about race, some methods by which the debatability of racism is perpetuated include avoidance of any pointed language about race or racism, denying or debating what actions can be counted as racism, and confining 'true' racism to a historical time period.

Other forms of racism that are deployed in the news are symbolic racism and nationalist language, where minorities are criticized due to their actions as opposed to their identity and are indirectly referenced as parties that cannot uphold the values of greater society and must be defended against.

== Education ==
Covert racism in the education system is shown both academically and through disciplinary measures. Discipline policies, including mandatory, zero-tolerance suspensions or expulsions for minor offenses, fuel the school-to-prison pipeline. According to the National School Boards Association (NBSA), white students are statistically more likely to be placed in an academic track. Of the black students who take the SAT, less than 60% are enrolled in an academic track, whereas about 90% of white students taking the SAT are on the academic track.

Such concealed acts of racism impact education by lowering expectations, lacking rigor in curricula, lacking experienced teachers, making fallacious assumptions about students’ intelligence, and raising issues in public policy. Despite the lack of explicit racism, covert racism continues to thwart the possibility of a successful future for black students. As stated by NSBA President Charlie Wilson, these practices and policies are critical factors that lead to gaps in the quality of education between black and white students.

Studies have also shown stark resource disparities in predominantly black or Latino schools and white suburban schools. It has been shown that schools with predominantly black students have scarce textbooks, and students are not allowed to take them home. In some states, like Mississippi, the textbooks and resources are so outdated that many of the new events in history have not yet been added to them. Bathroom access has also been cited as an issue in predominantly black and Latino schools. At some schools, there was a lack of bathrooms, resulting in infestations with vermin.

Many black activists have cited the lack of a well-resourced education as a stain on America's meritocracy. Without equality of condition or opportunity, some argue that black students lack the resources necessary to accrue financial and cultural capital.

== Following major events ==
Major traumatic events involving different ethnic groups result in an increase in both overt and covert racism. Following traumatic events, there is a compulsion for individuals to continue to associate the past with the present. In the example of 9/11, the United States experienced an increase in exceptionalism as well as the creation of the idea of Arab people as terrorists and menacing people. To this day, the association of Arab people with this event has resulted in de cardio racism, as observed through the media and polls showing that half of polled young Arab Americans had experienced discrimination (whether that be de jure or de cardio) after 9/11. Major events also include events that span over longer periods; as an example, the prohibition of interracial marriage in the United States, which after legal changes still caused interracial couples to face hostility through both covert and overt racism, as seen with "preserve the race" language. Another example is slavery in the Caribbean and how the slot that slaves socially took up in the context of white Europeans still permeates the modern day, creating covert racism and resulting in differing work opportunities.

== See also ==
- Critical race theory
- Bradley effect
- Crypto-fascism
- Ethnopluralism
- Ghost skin
- Identity politics
- Institutional racism
- Internalized racism
- Laissez-faire racism
- Microaggression
- Micro-inequity
- Passive-aggressive behavior
- Race card
- Racial discrimination
- Racial segregation
- Redlining
- Second-class citizen
- Truthiness
- White defensiveness
- White flight
- White privilege
- Silent majority
