= Margaret Wente =

Canadian journalist

- Born: 15 February 1950 (age 76); Evanston, Illinois, U.S.
- Citizenship: American and Canadian
- Education: BA (University of Michigan); MA, English (University of Toronto)
- Occupation: Columnist
- Spouse: Ian McLeod

Margaret Wente (born 15 February 1950) is a Canadian journalist and was a long-time columnist for The Globe and Mail until August 2019. She received the National Newspaper Award for column-writing in 2000 and 2001. In 2012, Wente was found to have plagiarized on a number of occasions. She was suspended from writing her column, but later reinstated. However, in 2016, she was found to have failed to meet her newspaper's attribution standards in two more columns.

== Early life and education ==
Wente was born in Evanston, Illinois and moved to Toronto, Ontario in 1964 when her mother married a Canadian. She has since become a naturalized Canadian citizen. She holds a BA in English from the University of Michigan and an MA in English from the University of Toronto. In 2004 Margaret Wente published Accidental Canadian, her autobiographical account of becoming a columnist at The Globe and Mail.

Though Wente did her undergraduate college studies in Ann Arbor, Michigan, every year from May through August she returned to Toronto to serve tables at The Coffee Mill, a Hungarian restaurant in Toronto's Yorkville neighbourhood:

I schlepped espressos and salami sandwiches, oceans of goulash and mountains of pastries and gallons of orange frappes. [The Coffee Mill] offered a hint of continental sophistication in a city that was still hopelessly parochial….Some of the customers were genuine writers…In nice weather they could sit outdoors on a terrace…I was serving the intelligentsia…I wore a white polyester apron with a miniskirt and high-heeled sandals. (p 41)

After graduating from University of Michigan, she felt that the U.S. was in a "dark phase, torn apart by the politics of Vietnam"; she chose to live and work in Canada.

== Career ==
Wente was "hired right out of university to be a book publicist" (p 20). Her first assignment was a book on the Summit Series, a confrontation in 1972 of national ice hockey teams from Canada and Russia. She did her job and spent time with the coach, but in her own memoir shows her opinion:

[Hockey] is a sport where they send their big star out to play after he's had his seventh concussion. He says he's fine, but how would he know? His brain has turned to scrambled eggs. (p 23)

She claims "Hockey does not promote civic engagement. It destroys it" (p 24).

Wente was hired by The Globe and Mail in 1986. For a time, she was editor of the paper's business section, the ROB (Report on Business), and managing editor of the paper. In 1992 she became a regular columnist for The Globe and Mail. She is a frequent commentator on television and radio, and has won several journalism awards.

In June 2019, Wente accepted a buyout from The Globe and Mail. Her last column with the newspaper was published on 31 August 2019.

=== Incidents of plagiarism ===
In September 2012, Wente was found to have committed plagiarism by Carol Wainio, a blogger and artist who accused Wente of lifting quotes and rewording passages from published sources without credit. Wainio documents on her blog, Media Culpa, a series of columns and articles published from 2009 to 2012, which plagiarize sources including the Ottawa Citizen, the New York Times and Foreign Affairs. On 21 September 2012, the Globe and Mail's public editor addressed the allegations, conceding that "there appears to be some truth to the accusations but not on every charge".

The Globe and Mail subsequently took unspecified punitive actions against Wente for a column written in 2009. Editor John Stackhouse acknowledged that "the journalism in this instance did not meet the standards of The Globe and Mail", noting that the work in question was "unacceptable". However, Wente continued to write for the Globe and Mail. Wente herself wrote a column to defend herself against accusations of being a "serial plagiarist" but acknowledged she was "extremely careless". She took a break from writing her column for a week. On 11 October she resumed with a column explaining her actions and offered an apology.

She was also suspended from CBC Radio where she appeared as a biweekly media panelist on the program Q due to her not meeting the CBC's journalistic standards as a result of the 2009 incident.

In 2016, the Globe and Mail confirmed two additional incidents of plagiarism by Wente. Editor-in-chief David Walmsley stated: "This work fell short of our standards, something that we apologize for. It shouldn't have happened and the Opinion team will be working with Peggy to ensure this cannot happen again."

=== Rape culture denial controversy ===
In her Globe and Mail column, on Saturday, 1 March 2014, Wente criticized Canadian universities for their response to the Saint Mary's rape chant controversy, in particular their view that all drunken sex is rape. She went on to argue that rape culture is a fiction and that the concept of affirmative consent is part of the "war on men". Wente's column was subsequently referred to as "irresponsible nonsense" by fellow journalists Toula Drimonis and Ethan Cox.

== Massey College appointment ==
Wente was appointed as a 2020–2021 senior fellow and member of the Quadrangle Society at Massey College, in June 2020. Her appointment caused an uproar among faculty and students, both because of past allegations against her of plagiarism, and due to her writings on issues of race and gender. University of Toronto professor Alissa Trotz resigned from her senior fellowship as well as her positions on the college's Governing Board and Governance and Nominating Committee in protest of what she called the college's "non-transparent mechanisms of selection," referring to Wente as "someone who has demonstrated consistent and outright hostility to questions of equity, women and gender studies and anti-racism, and moreover someone who has demonstrated such a glaring lack of professional integrity." Senior fellows Rick Halpern and George Dei also resigned their positions in protest of Wente's appointment. One day after the appointment was made, the college announced that it was reviewing the appointment and Wente's "writings and conduct to assess whether they are consistent with the college’s values". On 22 June 2020, Wente wrote the college's governing council to inform them of her resignation from the position, stating "I do not wish to be a member of the Quadrangle Society. The accusations against me are false and outrageous. My record speaks for itself". In July, historian Margaret MacMillan resigned her senior fellowship in protest of the college's decision to review Wente's appointment.

== Other roles ==
Wente was formerly a director of the Energy Probe Research Foundation.

== Publications ==
- 1975: "I Never Say Anything Provocative:" Witticisms, Anecdotes, and Reflections by Canada's Most Outspoken Politician, John G. Diefenbaker, Peter Martin Associates, ISBN 0-88778-132-2 . (Compiler and Editor)
- 2004: An Accidental Canadian: Reflections on My Home and (Not) Native Land, HarperCollins, ISBN 0-00-200798-3 .
- 2009: You Can't Say That in Canada, HarperCollins, ISBN 978-1-55468-468-7 .
