= Yiling Chen =

Chinese-American computer scientist

Yiling Chen is a Chinese-American computer scientist who studies computational economics, social computing, algorithmic game theory, prediction markets, and algorithmic fairness in machine learning. She is Gordon McKay Professor of Computer Science in the Harvard John A. Paulson School of Engineering and Applied Sciences.

== Education and career ==
Chen was an undergraduate at the Renmin University of China, where she earned a bachelor's degree in economics in 1996, specializing in commodity science. She continued her studies in economics with a master's degree at Tsinghua University in 1999, and began doctoral work at Iowa State University in 2000. However, in 2001 she moved to the program in information sciences and technology at Pennsylvania State University, where she completed her Ph.D. in 2005.

After a short assistant professorship at Framingham State College and postdoctoral research at Yahoo! Research, she joined Harvard University as an assistant professor of computer science in 2008. She was promoted to associate professor in 2012, named as the John L. Loeb Associate Professor of Natural Sciences in 2013, and promoted to full professor as Gordon McKay Professor of Computer Science in 2015.

== Recognition ==
The Pennsylvania State University alumni gave Chen their Graduate School Alumni Society (GSAS) Early Career Award in 2016.
