= Center for Equal Opportunity =

American conservative think tank

- Founded: 1995
- Founder: Linda Chavez
- Type: National policy think tank
- Purpose: Colorblind admissions, anti-affirmative action
- Location: Washington, D.C., U.S.
- Region served: United States
- Key people: Linda Chavez, Devon Westhill
- Revenue: $557,750 (2021)
- Expenses: $491,627 (2021)
- Website: www.ceousa.org

The Center for Equal Opportunity (CEO) is an American conservative think tank whose mission is to study, develop, and disseminate ideas that promote colorblind equal opportunity and oppose affirmative action in the United States .

== Overview ==
=== Founding ===
The founder and chairman of the Center for Equal Opportunity is Linda Chavez, and the president and general counsel is Devon Westhill. Westhill, who is Black, argues his degree from the University of North Carolina is tarnished because of the university's non-colorblind admissions policy, as he believes others could assume he was admitted due to his race.

=== Contributions ===
Since 1995, the Center for Equal Opportunity has released dozens of studies documenting the extent to which race is a factor in American college admissions at over 60 colleges and universities.

In 2019, it issued a complaint against Texas Tech's medical school that the school's use of race as an admissions criterion was illegal. The complaint was settled when the school announced it would no longer consider an applicant's race and/or ethnicity.

In 2021, Chavez argued U.S. democracy was threatened both by Donald Trump supporting election deniers and by progressive advocates of transgender rights and critical race theory.

=== Present day ===
The Center for Equal Opportunity is a member of the advisory board of Project 2025, a collection of conservative and right-wing policy proposals from the Heritage Foundation to reshape the United States federal government and consolidate executive power.

== See also ==
- John M. Olin Foundation
- Gerald A. Reynolds
- Abigail Thernstrom
- John J. Miller
- Roger Clegg
- Equality of opportunity
