= Devon Westhill =

American attorney and government official

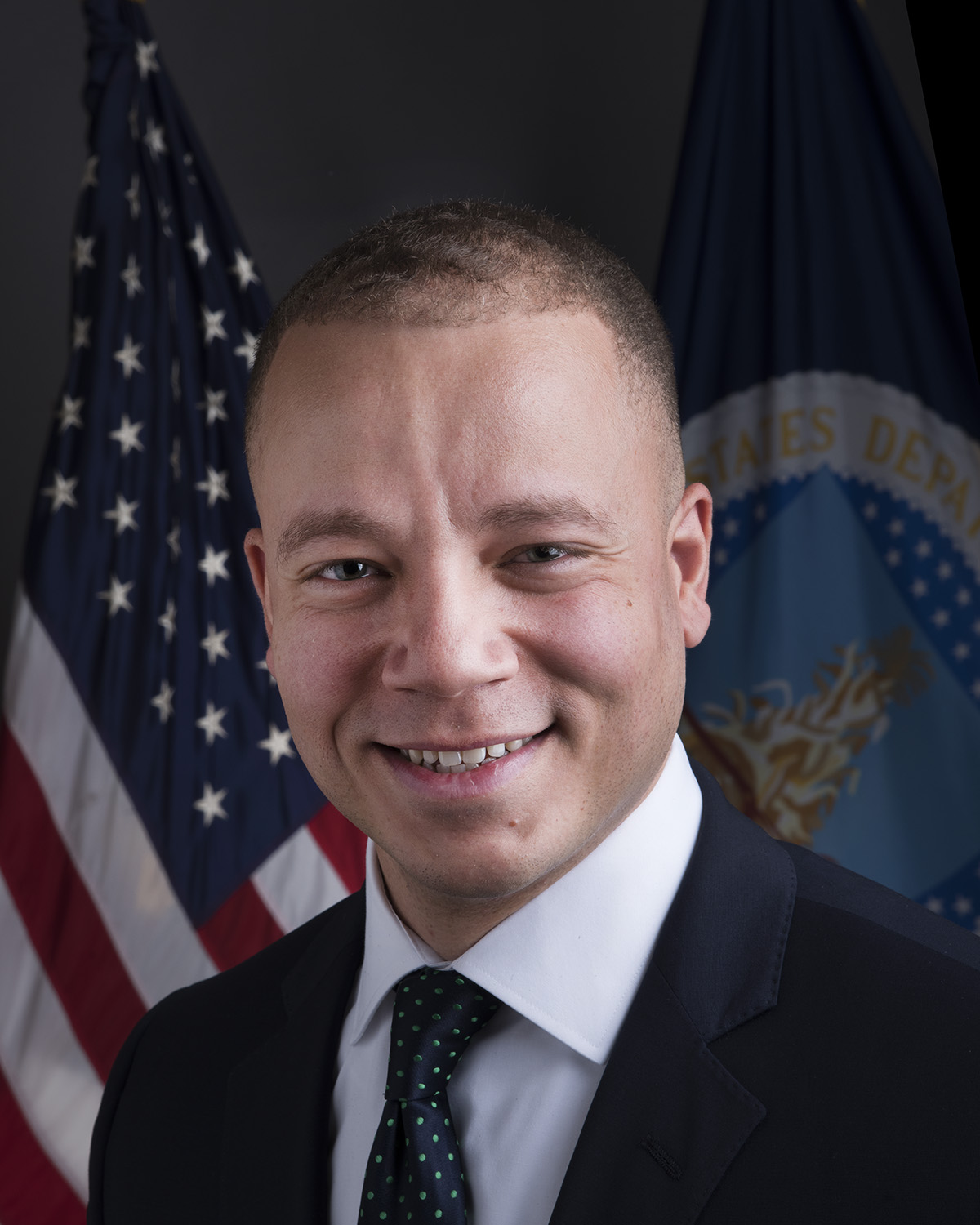
- Official Portrait, 2020

Assistant Secretary of Agriculture for Civil Rights
- Incumbent
- Assumed office October 15, 2025
- President: Donald Trump
- Preceded by: Joe Leonard, Jr.

Personal details
- Education: University of North Carolina at Chapel Hill (BA), University of Florida Levin College of Law (JD)

Military service
- Allegiance: United States
- Branch/service: United States Navy

Devon Westhill is an American attorney and government official who currently serves as the Assistant Secretary for Civil Rights at the United States Department of Agriculture (USDA) in President Trump's second term. He was confirmed by the U.S. Senate in 2025, becoming the first Senate-confirmed leader of USDA's civil rights office in 16 years. Westhill previously led the civil rights office as Deputy Assistant Secretary for Civil Rights at USDA during the first Trump administration from 2020 to 2021.

== Early life and education ==
Westhill, who is a biracial black man, was raised in Florida by his single white mother alongside his two siblings in what he has described as "hardscrabble" circumstances. He has spoken publicly about being raised in poverty in the South and credits his mother's dedication and being born in America as the key factors that shaped his life trajectory. After an enlistment in the United States Navy, Westhill earned his Bachelor of Arts degree from the University of North Carolina at Chapel Hill and his Juris Doctor degree from the University of Florida's Fredric G. Levin College of Law in 2014, where he was named to the Dean's List. During law school, he served as an extern for Florida Supreme Court Justice Charles T. Canady.

== Career ==
=== Legal Practice ===
Westhill began his legal career as a criminal trial lawyer in Florida, where his practice focused on defending clients accused of criminal offenses, representing students in university conduct violations, and handling civil asset forfeiture cases.

=== Nonprofit and Policy Work ===
Westhill worked with the Federalist Society, a conservative legal organization, where his work centered on advancing economic opportunity, individual liberty, and limited constitutional government through deregulation efforts at the local, state, and federal levels. In January 2021, he was named president and general counsel of the Center for Equal Opportunity (CEO), a conservative think tank focused on civil rights issues. During his tenure at CEO, Westhill filed numerous legal briefs and was involved in various efforts in support of the Supreme Court's eventual 2023 landmark decision in Students for Fair Admissions v. Harvard, which ended race-based affirmative action in college admissions. He launched CEO's "After Affirmative Action Network" to ensure educational institutions were complying with the ruling.

=== U.S. Department of Labor ===
Prior to his first appointment at USDA, Westhill served as a Trump Administration appointee at the United States Department of Labor as Deputy Director of the Office of Public Liaison where he managed outreach to legal and policy organizations, think tanks, and the administrative law scholar community.

=== First Tenure at USDA (2020–2021) ===
In March 2020, President Donald Trump appointed Westhill to serve as Deputy Assistant Secretary for Civil Rights at USDA. He was sworn in by Secretary of Agriculture Sonny Perdue on March 12, 2020. In this role, Westhill led the Office of the Assistant Secretary for Civil Rights.

=== Return to USDA (2025–present) ===
President Donald Trump nominated Westhill to be Assistant Secretary for Civil Rights on February 3, 2025. On April 29, 2025, Westhill testified before the Senate Agriculture, Nutrition, and Forestry Committee for his nomination and on May 21, 2025 the Senate Agriculture Committee advanced his nomination to the Senate floor on a party line vote. Westhill was confirmed by the Senate on a party line vote among a bloc of nominees on October 7, 2025, making him the first Senate-confirmed leader of the office since the Obama administration. He was sworn in as Assistant Secretary for Civil Rights by Secretary of Agriculture Brooke L. Rollins on October 15, 2025. Westhill has emphasized his commitment to enforcing civil rights laws and ensuring equal treatment of all USDA customers and employees, regardless of race, color, or ethnicity.

== Public Commentary and Advocacy ==
Westhill has been an active commentator on civil rights issues, with his writing appearing in publications including NBC News, Bloomberg Law, The Wall Street Journal, National Review, and Newsweek. He has testified before both houses of the U.S. Congress, the Equal Employment Opportunity Commission, and the U.S. Commission on Civil Rights, and has served as an expert witness in federal court. He has spoken at numerous college campuses and conferences on topics including civil rights, civil liberties, race relations, social change, and equal opportunity.

Westhill has been a vocal critic of diversity, equity, and inclusion (DEI) policies that he views as implementing racial preferences, arguing that such practices violate principles of equal protection under the law. He has praised corporations like John Deere, Harley Davidson, and Tractor Supply Company for reevaluating their DEI initiatives.

== Philosophy and Views ==
Westhill has cited Frederick Douglass and Booker T. Washington as personal heroes and has emphasized his belief in character-based judgment over race-based outcomes. He has stated that his life experiences growing up in challenging circumstances have made him passionate about civil rights enforcement and equal opportunity.

In his confirmation hearing, Westhill committed to building relationships with all USDA customers and employees and ensuring that anyone wanting to do business with USDA could do so "on equal footing."
