= Bulverism =

Type of logical fallacy

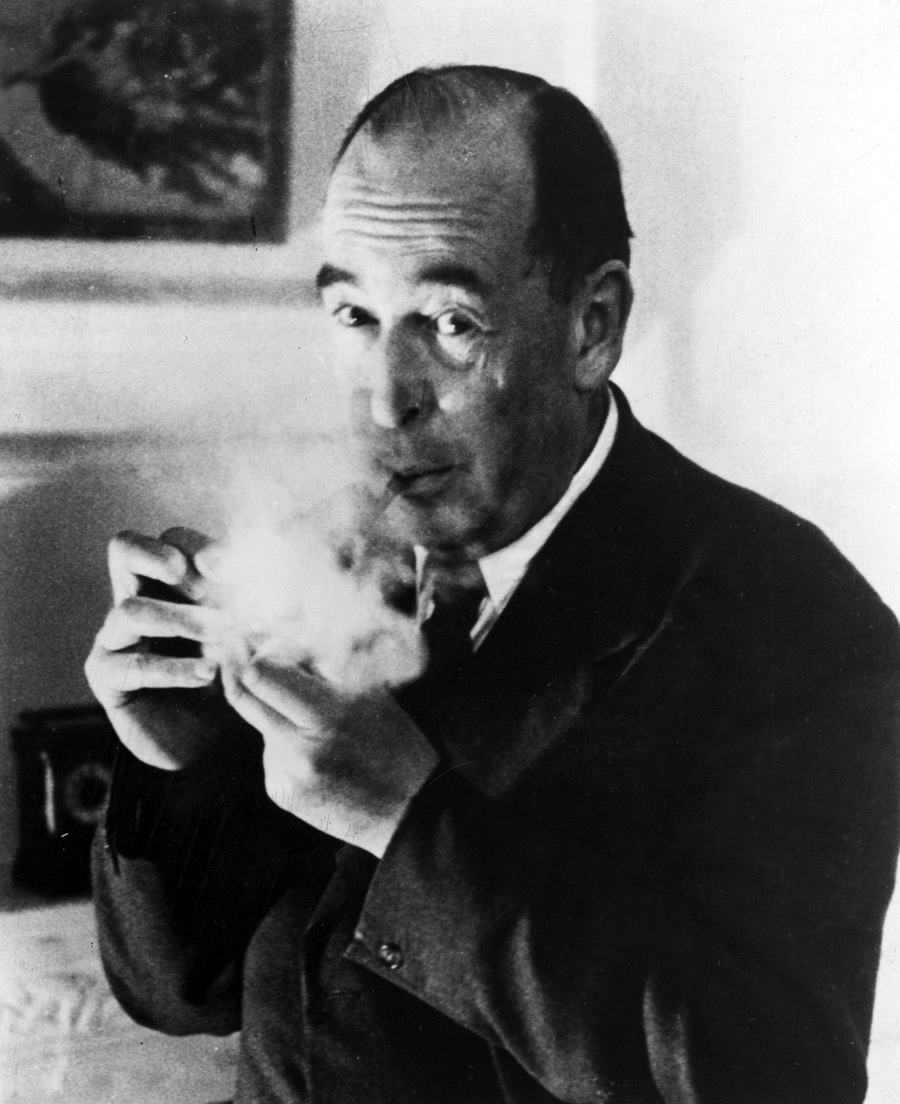
The term was coined by C. S. Lewis, a British author, scholar and Christian apologist.

Bulverism is a rhetorical fallacy that combines circular reasoning, the genetic fallacy and ad hominem with presumption or condescension. The Bulverist presumes that a speaker's argument is false or invalid and then explains why the speaker made that argument (even if said argument is actually correct) by attacking the speaker or the speaker's motive.

The term Bulverism was coined by C. S. Lewis (after "its imaginary inventor, Ezekiel Bulver") to poke fun at a serious error in thinking that, he alleged, frequently occurred in a variety of religious, political, and philosophical debates.

== Source of the concept ==
Lewis wrote about this in a 1941 essay, which was later expanded and published in 1944 in The Socratic Digest under the title "Bulverism". This was reprinted both in Undeceptions and the more recent anthology God in the Dock in 1970. He explains the origin of this term:

Suppose I think, after doing my accounts, that I have a large balance at the bank. And suppose you want to find out whether this belief of mine is "wishful thinking." You can never come to any conclusion by examining my psychological condition. Your only chance of finding out is to sit down and work through the sum yourself. When you have checked my figures, then, and then only, will you know whether I have that balance or not. If you find my arithmetic correct, then no amount of vapouring about my psychological condition can be anything but a waste of time. If you find my arithmetic wrong, then it may be relevant to explain psychologically how I came to be so bad at my arithmetic, and the doctrine of the concealed wish will become relevant—but only after you have yourself done the sum and discovered me to be wrong on purely arithmetical grounds. It is the same with all thinking and all systems of thought. If you try to find out which are tainted by speculating about the wishes of the thinkers, you are merely making a fool of yourself. You must first find out on purely logical grounds which of them do, in fact, break down as arguments. Afterwards, if you like, go on and discover the psychological causes of the error.

You must show that a man is wrong before you start explaining why he is wrong. The modern method is to assume without discussion that he is wrong and then distract his attention from this (the only real issue) by busily explaining how he became so silly. In the course of the last fifteen years I have found this vice so common that I have had to invent a name for it. I call it "Bulverism". Some day I am going to write the biography of its imaginary inventor, Ezekiel Bulver, whose destiny was determined at the age of five when he heard his mother say to his father—who had been maintaining that two sides of a triangle were together greater than a third—"Oh you say that because you are a man." "At that moment", E. Bulver assures us, "there flashed across my opening mind the great truth that refutation is no necessary part of argument. Assume that your opponent is wrong, and explain his error, and the world will be at your feet. Attempt to prove that he is wrong or (worse still) try to find out whether he is wrong or right, and the national dynamism of our age will thrust you to the wall." That is how Bulver became one of the makers of the Twentieth Century.

— C. S. Lewis, Bulverism

== Threat and remedy ==
The special threat of this fallacy lies in that it applies equally to the person who errs as to that person's opponent. Lewis says, "Until Bulverism is crushed, reason can play no effective part in human affairs. Each side snatches it early as a weapon against the other; but between the two reason itself is discredited."

The remedy, according to Lewis, is to accept that some reasoning is not tainted by the reasoner.

== See also ==
- Appeal to motive
- Circular reasoning
- Genetic fallacy
- Well he would, wouldn't he?

== Bibliography ==
- Lewis, Clive Staples (1971), Hooper, Walter (ed.), Undeceptions: Essays on Theology and Ethics, London: Geoffrey Bles.
