= Race card =

Idiom

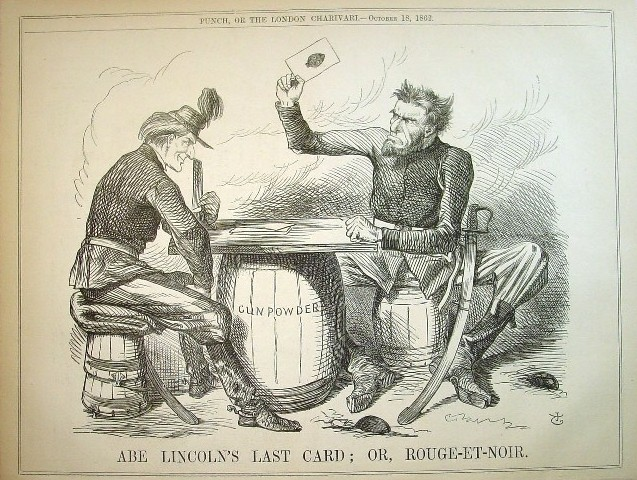
Cartoon by John Tenniel published following Abraham Lincoln's Emancipation Proclamation. The phrase itself came into use more than 100 years later.

"Playing the race card" is an idiomatic phrase that suggests someone is exploiting either racist or anti-racist attitudes in order to gain an advantage. It constitutes an accusation of bad faith directed at the person or persons raising issues of race and racism, whether to gain support or sympathy as a target of racism, or to appeal to racist sentiments in others. Critics of the term argue that it has been utilised to silence public discourse around racial disparities and undermine anti-racist initiatives.

== Origins ==
The origins of the term are unclear, although the earliest recorded usage appears in The Observer, where the paper said "the Tory leadership declined to play the race card". In other words, the Conservative Party refused to use the subject of race as a political issue to win favour with the electorate. The phrase was retroactively used to describe racist mobilisations by other politicians in the United Kingdom, as for example with the campaign to elect Peter Griffiths, the Conservative candidate for Smethwick in the 1964 UK general election. The term was only applied to describe this particular situation in the 1980s.

The term was popularised in the United States around the time of the O.J. Simpson murder case. In this context, it was used to mean that Simpson's defence lawyers were attempting to use racism to discredit a prosecution witness.

== Usage ==
The phrase is generally used to suggest that someone has deliberately and falsely accused another person or group of people of being a racist in order to gain some sort of advantage. The term may also indicate a person is generating or exploiting racist sentiment in their audience for gain.

Stanford Law School professor Richard Thompson Ford has argued that the race card can be played independently of the person making the claim, or the race in question. An example cited was the Hillary Clinton campaign's assertion that Barack Obama won the 2008 Democratic primary in South Carolina owing to the disproportionate number of Black-registered Democrats in the state, implying more racism in the general population. George Dei, et al., in the book Playing the Race Card, argue that the term itself is a rhetorical device used in an effort to devalue and minimise claims of racism.

=== United Kingdom ===
Sir Herman Ouseley, former chairman of the Commission for Racial Equality in the United Kingdom, said, "Despite their promises, electioneering politicians are toying with the 'race card'."

Katharine Birbalsingh, a British educationalist of Indo-Guyanese and Jamaican heritage, suggests that if children are being disciplined at school, parents should be sceptical if the child subsequently suggests this is racially motivated. She advises that parents back the teachers in the first instance because ethnic minority children can "have an extra card to play" if they learn that parents will "indulge" unjustified claims of grievance, contributing to low expectations which may hold these children back.

=== United States ===
The term was popularised during the O. J. Simpson murder case, when critics accused the defense of "playing the race card", in presenting Mark Fuhrman's past as reasons to draw his credibility as a witness into question.

The Republican Southern Strategy has been characterised as an early example of exploiting racist sentiments for political mobilisation and exaggerating the threat of the civil rights movement. Consequently, this strategy facilitated the transformation of the Southern states from a Democratic to Republican political stronghold.

=== Malaysia ===
In February 2008, Group Chief Editor Wong Chun Wai of The Star wrote, just before the Malaysia general election came, there is an unusual degree of tolerance and flexibility in matters of race, language and religion as politicians try to woo the people. "Also, there are those who still continue to play the race card, in this age and time. At their party conferences each year, they play to the gallery by projecting themselves as the communal heroes. But during the general election, they shamelessly become the true Malaysian leaders we dream of. They greet their voters in Malay, English, Mandarin and Tamil; and if they can speak all these languages fluently, they would do so."

In August 2006, the Singapore Institute of International Affairs wrote that Malaysia politician Khairy Jamaluddin "played the race card" by stirring up the Malays and the Chinese Malaysian community. Responding to criticisms and demands for an apology, Khairy said his remarks were misunderstood and he "will not apologize" as he was acting only "in defense of the Malays and his party" and that "if we truly fight for our race, one should not apologize".

== See also ==
- Appeal to motive
- Boerehaat
- Call-out culture
- Identity politics
- Laissez-faire racism
- Race baiting
- Wedge issue
- Woman card
- Weaponization of antisemitism
