= Woman card =

Metaphor for rhetorical use of one's female identity

The "woman card" is a metaphor referring to the exploitation of one's female identity for rhetorical gain. A person who employs this tactic is said to be "playing the woman card". Variant usages are "sex card" and "gender card".

== Meaning ==
The term denotes a woman's mention of her gender to gain advantage in a discussion or a claim of another's sexism or misogyny intended to garner support from third parties. Miranda Devine has stated that "[p]laying the gender card is the pathetic last refuge of incompetents and everyone in the real world knows it". Others have argued that an accusation of "playing the woman card" may be used to dismiss real problems and to undermine the credibility of the person so accused.

== Politics ==
Accusations of playing the woman card often occur in politics and elections. In 2012, Australian Prime Minister Julia Gillard made a speech in the Australian Parliament accusing Opposition leader Tony Abbott of misogyny. Gillard's speech received international attention and was widely praised, including, reportedly, by a number of foreign political leaders including François Hollande, Barack Obama, and Hillary Clinton. Some local commentators (predominantly conservative), however, accused Gillard of playing the gender card.

In the 2008 Democratic Party presidential primaries former President of the United States Bill Clinton was viewed to have played the gender card in order to garner support for his wife Hillary and likewise accused Barack Obama of using the race card against them. During the 2016 United States presidential election campaign, Republican Party nominee Donald Trump accused his rival, the Democratic Party's Hillary Clinton of playing the woman card stating she was "constantly playing the woman card. It's the only way she may get elected." Clinton responded, stating "if fighting for women's healthcare and paid family leave and equal pay is playing the woman card, then deal me in". Afterwards, Clinton's campaign started to issue plastic cards which said "Woman Card" based on the MetroCard from New York City, to donors who gave at least $5 to her campaign. The plan was viewed as a marketing success and a backfire from Trump, as it earned Clinton $2.4 million.

During the 2017 French presidential election, Front National candidate Marine Le Pen was viewed as using her gender to soften views of the Front National, as well as through modernization of the party's image. Le Pen's candidacy was also cited as an example where feminists who claim they vote for candidates because they are female, refused to do so.

== See also ==
- Appeal to motive
- Call-out culture
- Race card
