= Post-racial America =

Theoretical future utopian United States

Post-racial United States is a theoretical environment in which the United States is free from racial preference, discrimination, and prejudice.

== Origins of the term ==
One of the earliest uses of the term "post-racial" to describe the United States was in an October 5, 1971, article in The New York Times titled "Compact Set Up for 'Post-Racial' South". The article reported the establishment of a "Southern Growth Policies Board" in Durham, North Carolina, "by some 70 politicians and professors who believe their region of 60 million citizens has entered an era in which race relations are soon to be replaced as a major concern by population increase, industrial development, and economic fluctuations".

== 2008 presidential election ==
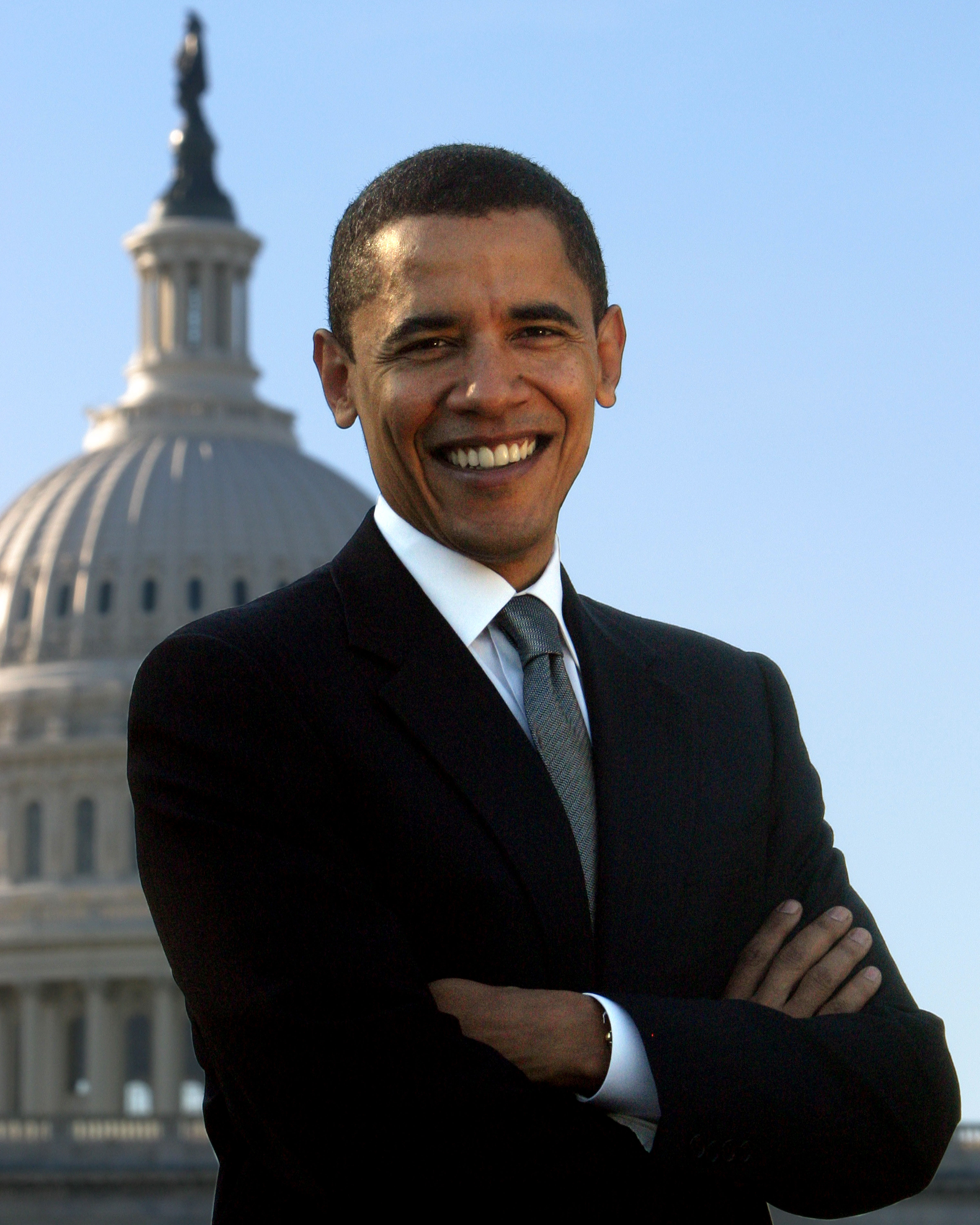
Barack Obama as a Senator

Some Americans saw the presidential candidacy of Barack Obama, and his election in 2008 as the first black president of the United States, as a sign that the nation had, in fact, become post-racial. The conservative radio host Lou Dobbs, for example, said in November 2009, "We are now in a 21st-century post-partisan, post-racial society." Two months later, Chris Matthews, an MSNBC host, said of President Obama, "He is post-racial by all appearances. You know, I forgot he was black tonight for an hour."

However, public opinion on whether the United States is post-racial is itself divided starkly by race. In a Washington Post/ABC News poll conducted in December 2014, about 50% of white respondents said they believed that the justice system treats Americans of all races equally, but only 10% of African-Americans said the same. In the spring of 2015, according to a Gallup poll, 13% of black Americans surveyed identified race relations as the most important problem the United States faces, compared with 4% of white Americans.

Arguments that the United States is not post-racial frequently emphasize the treatment of African-Americans and other racial minorities in the criminal justice system and in interactions with the police. Killings of unarmed African-Americans, often by police officers, have been widely publicized. In 2015, according to a study by The Guardian, police officers in the United States killed 7.13 black Americans per million, compared with 2.91 white Americans per million. Additionally:

Young black men were nine times more likely than other Americans to be killed by police officers in 2015, according to the findings of a Guardian study that recorded a final tally of 1,134 deaths at the hands of law enforcement officers this year. Despite making up only 2% of the total US population, African American males between the ages of 15 and 34 comprised more than 15% of all deaths logged this year by an ongoing investigation into the use of deadly force by police. Their rate of police-involved deaths was five times higher than for white men of the same age.

Such killings had a marked effect on public perceptions of race relations in America. The 13 percent of black Americans who called race relations the most pressing problem in the United States in the spring 2015 Gallup poll dwarfed the 3 percent that Gallup reported at the beginning of 2014. And the percentage of white Americans who said race relations were the most important issue rose to 4 percent in 2015 from 1 percent in 2014.

In response to high-profile incidents such as the fatal shootings of Michael Brown, Aiyana Jones, Trayvon Martin, Laquan McDonald, Tamir Rice, and Walter Scott, and the death of Freddie Gray from a spinal-cord injury sustained in police custody, academics and journalists have denounced claims that America is post-racial. Ta-Nehisi Coates wrote in The Atlantic in 2015 that the phrase "post-racial" was "usually employed by talk-show hosts and news anchors looking to measure progress in the Obama era." And Anna Holmes wrote in The New York Times, "Chattel slavery and the legacies it left behind continue to shape American society. Sometimes it seems as if the desire for a 'post-racial' America is an attempt by white people to liberate themselves from the burden of having to deal with that legacy."

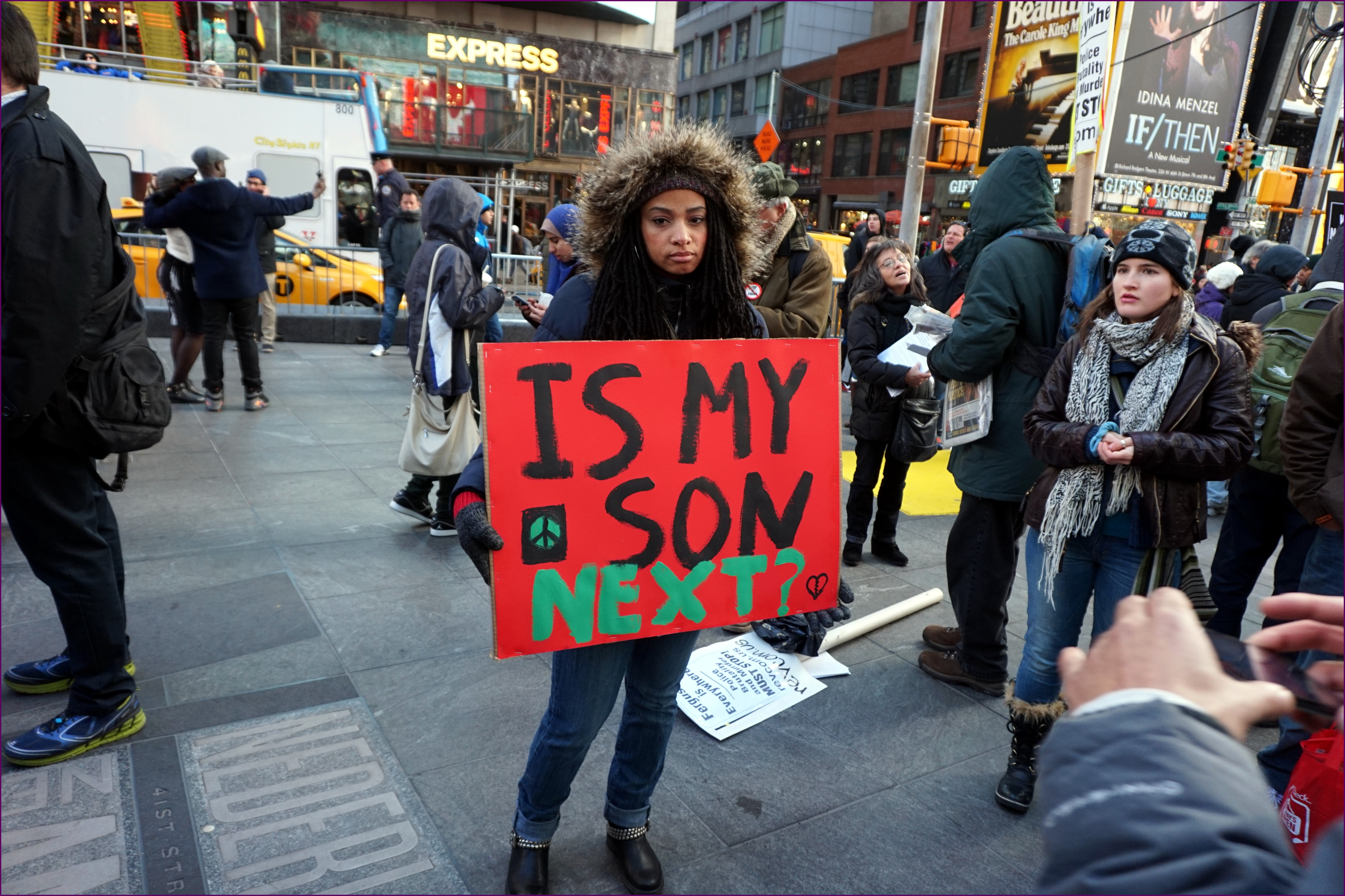
Black Lives Matter protester

However, others argue that post-racial politics champions aggressive action to deliver economic opportunity and weed out police misconduct, without the divisive framing of racial identity. The divide in public opinion on the status of race in America was reflected in reactions to the Black Lives Matter movement. In response to the "black lives matter" rallying cry, some people, including politicians, began using the phrase "all lives matter". In August 2015, after a sheriff's deputy in Harris County, Texas, was fatally shot while pumping gas, Sheriff Ron Hickman claimed that the rhetoric of Black Lives Matter activists had contributed to the killing and said, "We've heard 'black lives matter'. All lives matter. Well, cops' lives matter, too. So why don't we just drop the qualifier and just say 'lives matter', and take that to the bank.'

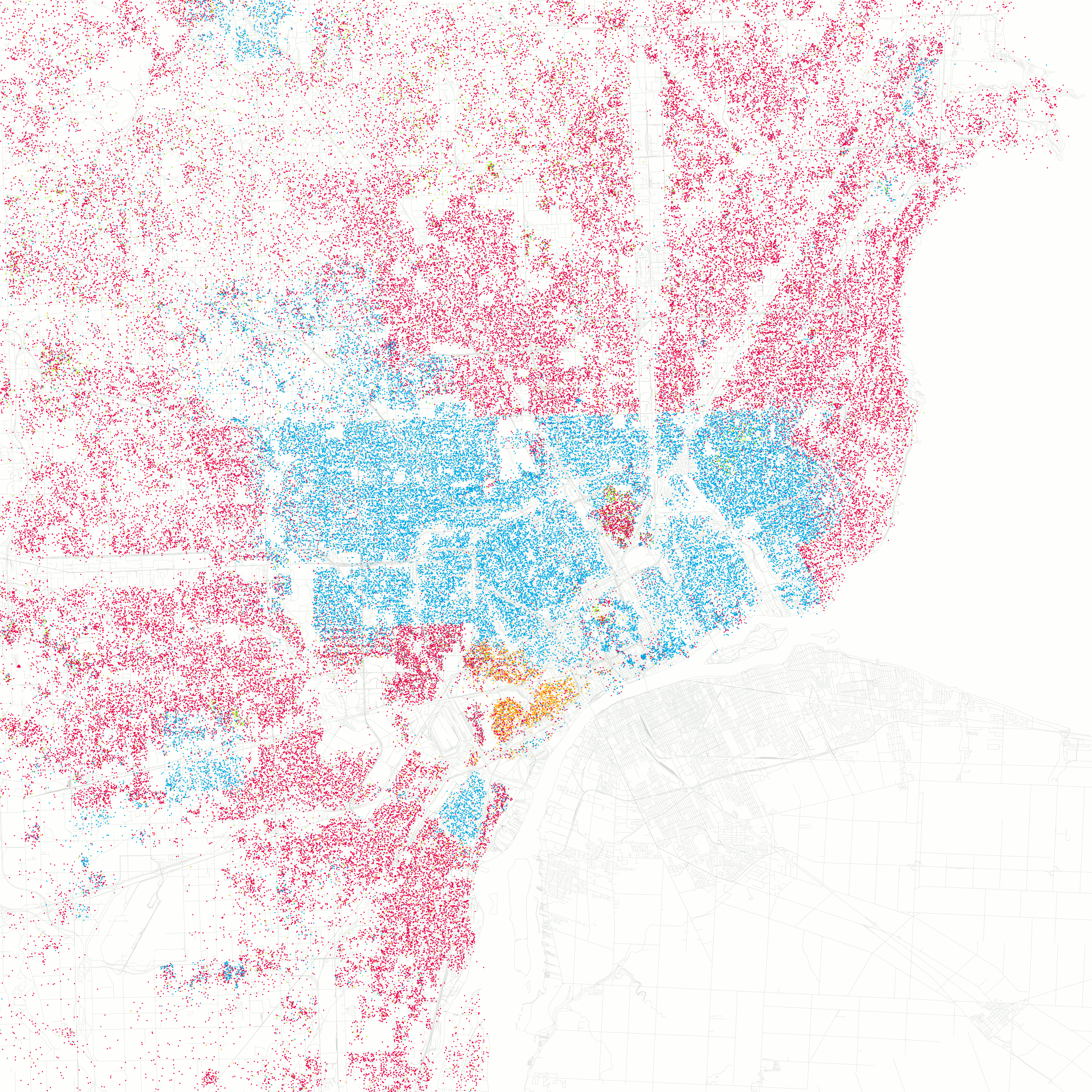
Detroit, Michigan (2000): Caucasians in red, African-Americans in blue, Hispanics in orange, and Asians in green. A dot represents 25 people.

Supporters of the Black Lives Matter movement criticized the "all lives matter" phrase, arguing that it minimized the systemic threats faced by African-Americans. President Obama said in October, "There is a specific problem that is happening in the African-American community that's not happening in other communities." Andrew Rosenthal wrote, similarly, in The New York Times, "The point of 'Black Lives Matter' is that the lives of African-Americans have come under special and deadly threat since before the birth of this country."

Evidence of continued racial divisions in the United States can also be found in demographics. For instance, African-Americans account for less than 15 percent of the total population of Michigan, but more than 82 percent of the population of the state's largest city, Detroit — and Detroit, like many cities whose residents are predominantly black, has "resegregated schools, dwindling tax bases and decaying public services".

There is a similar dynamic in Louisiana; the state was about 64 percent white as of the 2010 Census, but its largest city, New Orleans, is 60 percent black. Further segregation can be found within New Orleans: the Lower Ninth Ward, for example, is 97 percent black. This was the neighborhood that experienced the most catastrophic flooding after Hurricane Katrina, and the government's response to the disaster has been cited as evidence of the continued presence of racism in the United States. Most of the victims were black and poor, and class was a major factor in who survived: Those who lived in areas better protected from flooding, and those who were able to evacuate before the storm, tended to be wealthier. At the time, President George W. Bush acknowledged that this poverty had "roots in the history of racial discrimination, which cut off generations from the opportunities of America".

== Political implications ==
The idea that America is post-racial, or close to it, has played a role in at least one United States Supreme Court decision. In Shelby County v. Holder in 2013, the court invalidated a section of the Voting Rights Act of 1965 that had required nine states with particularly severe histories of racial discrimination to obtain federal approval for any change to their election laws. The ruling, written by Chief Justice John G. Roberts Jr., said in part, "Our country has changed." It added that in the decades since the Voting Rights Act was passed, "voting tests were abolished, disparities in voter registration and turnout due to race were erased, and African-Americans attained political office in record numbers. And yet the coverage formula that Congress reauthorized in 2006 ignores these developments, keeping the focus on decades-old data relevant to decades-old problems, rather than current data reflecting current needs." Similar issues are involved in Fisher v. University of Texas, a challenge to affirmative action policies on which the court ruled in 2016, upholding the race-based admissions policy of the University of Texas.

Opponents of post-racialism argue that it ignores racial issues that are perceived as prevalent today. Harvard scholar Lawrence D. Bobo asserted that racism is still prevalent in subtle ways.

== See also ==
- Color blindness (race)
- Rainbow nation in South Africa
- Racial democracy in Brazil
