= Appeal to motive =

Questioning the motives of the proposer

Appeal to motive is a pattern of argument which consists in challenging a thesis by calling into question the motives of its proposer. It can be considered as a special case of the ad hominem circumstantial argument. As such, this type of argument is an informal fallacy.

A common feature of appeals to motive is that only the possibility of a motive (however small) is shown, without showing the motive actually existed or, if the motive did exist, that the motive played a role in forming the argument and its conclusion. Indeed, it is often assumed that the mere possibility of motive is evidence enough.

== Examples ==
- "The Nature Conservancy promoted an 'ivory-bill' in the Big Woods merely to raise funds from the public to purchase more conservation lands."
- "That website recommended ACME's widget over Megacorp's widget. But the website also displays ACME advertising on their site, so they must be biased in their review." The thesis in this case is the website's evaluation of the relative merits of the two products.
- "The referee is a New York City native, so his refereeing was obviously biased towards New York teams." In this case, the thesis consists of the referee's rulings.
- "My opponent argues on and on in favor of allowing that mall to be built in the center of town. What he won't tell you is that his daughter and her friends plan to shop there once it's open."

== See also ==
- Authorial intent – Author's intent as it is encoded in their work
- Ad hominem § Circumstantial
- Bulverism
- Call-out culture
- Conflict of interest
- Cui bono
- Race card
- Shooting the messenger
- Woman card
