= Racial color blindness =

Sociological and legal term for disregard of race

Racial color blindness refers to the belief that a person's race or ethnicity should not influence their legal or social treatment in society.

The American Psychological Association describes four beliefs that constitute the racial color-blindness approach, as follows:

1. Skin color is superficial and irrelevant to the quality of a person's character, ability or worthiness
2. In a merit-based society, skin color is irrelevant to merit judgments and calculation of fairness
3. As a corollary, in a merit-based society, merit and fairness are flawed if skin color is taken into the calculation
4. Ignoring skin color when interacting with people is the best way to avoid racial discrimination.

The term metaphorically references the medical phenomenon of color blindness. Psychologists and sociologists also study racial color blindness. This is further divided into two dimensions, color evasion and power evasion. Color evasion is the belief that people should not be treated differently on the basis of their color. Power evasion posits that systemic advantage based on color should have no influence on what people can accomplish, and accomplishments are instead based solely on one's own work performance.

At various times in American history, this term has been used to signal a desired or allegedly achieved state of freedom from racial prejudice or a desire that policies and laws should not consider race. Proponents of racial color blindness often assert that policies that differentiate by racial classification could tend to create, perpetuate or exacerbate racial divisiveness. Critics often believe it fails to address systemic discrimination.

It has been used by justices of the United States Supreme Court in several opinions relating to racial equality and social equity, particularly in public education.

== Outline ==
A color-blind society, in sociology, is one in which racial classification does not affect a person's socially created opportunities. A racially color blind society is or would be free from differential legal or social treatment based on race or color. A color-blind society would have race-neutral governmental policies and would reject all racial discrimination.

Racial color blindness reflects a societal ideal that skin color is insignificant. The ideal was most articulated "in the 1950's and 1960's along with the emergence of the Civil Rights Movement in the US and anti-racist movements abroad [such as] in the context of the struggle against Jim Crow ... or apartheid in South Africa". Color-blind ideology is based on tenets of non-discrimination, due process of law, equal protection under the law, and equal opportunities regardless of race, ideas which have strongly influenced Western liberalism in the post-World War II period.

Proponents of "color-blind" practices largely believe that treating people equally as individuals leads to a more equal society or that racism and race privilege no longer exercise the power in American society as it once did, rendering the need for policies such as race-based affirmative action obsolete.

== Support ==
Roger Clegg, a leader of the Center for Equal Opportunity, an American conservative think tank whose mission is to promote colorblind equal opportunity and oppose affirmative action in America, cites Martin Luther King Jr.'s "I Have a Dream" speech, in which King said, "I have a dream that my four little children will one day live in a nation where they will not be judged by the color of their skin but by the content of their character.", as an endorsement for the Center's work, saying "King gave a brilliant and moving quotation, and I think it says we should not be treating people differently on the basis of skin color”.

Supreme Court Justice Clarence Thomas has supported color-blind policies. He believes the Equal Protection Clause of the Fourteenth Amendment forbids consideration of race, such as race-based affirmative action or preferential treatment. He believes that race-oriented programs create "a cult of victimization" and imply black people require "special treatment in order to succeed".

Professor William Julius Wilson of Harvard University has argued that "class was becoming more important than race" in determining life prospects within the American black community. Wilson has published several works including The Declining Significance of Race (1978) and The Truly Dis-advantaged (1987) explaining his views on black poverty and racial inequality. He believes that affirmative action primarily benefits the most privileged individuals within the black community. This is because strictly race-based programs disregard a candidate's socioeconomic background and therefore fail to help the poorer portion of the black community that actually needs the assistance. He claims that in a society where millions of black people live in the middle and upper classes and millions of white people live in poverty, race is no longer an accurate indication of privilege. Wilson argued that recognizing someone's social class is more important than recognizing someone's race, indicating that society should be class-conscious, not race-conscious.

When defending new voting rights bills in 2020, Republican Texas legislators claimed that since the process they wanted to establish for voter registration did not involve different processes for people of different races and did not involve collecting information about race or ethnicity, their new requirements for eligibility to vote were "color blind" and should not be considered racially discriminatory.

Among conservative US presidents, color blindness as an idea has increased in the late 20th century as well as in the 21st century.

== Criticism ==
With respect to King's "I Have a Dream" speech and its use to promote racial color blindness today, Michael Eric Dyson said: "Martin Luther King, Jr., hoped for a color-blind society, but only as oppression and racism were destroyed. Then, when color suggested neither privilege nor punishment, human beings could enjoy the fruits of our common life. Until then, King realized that his hope was a distant but necessary dream.

In 1997, Leslie G. Carr published Color-Blind Racism which reviewed the history of racist ideologies in America. He saw "color-blindness" as an ideology that undercuts the legal and political foundation of racial integration and affirmative action.

Stephanie M. Wildman's Privilege Revealed: How Invisible Preference Undermines America, writes that advocates of a meritocratic, race-free worldview do not acknowledge the systems of privilege which benefit them, such as social and financial inheritance. She argues that this inheritance privileges "whiteness", "maleness", and heterosexuality while disadvantaging descendants of slaves.

Sociologist Ginger Jacobson criticized color-blind ideology as enabling systemic racism by permitting members of a hierarchical society to deny the obstacles people who are on the lower end of that hierarchy face.

Sociologist Eduardo Bonilla-Silva Eduardo has criticized racial color blindness as insufficient to address racial inequality in America. He argues it involves egalitarianism while opposing concrete proposals to reduce inequality. He has argued it ignores the under-representation of minorities in prestigious institutions, along with institutional practices that encourage segregation.

Bonilla-Silva writes that majority groups in the United States use color-blindness to avoid discussing racism and discrimination. This is supported by sociologist Jason Rodriquez who writes that color-blindness is a way to disconnect race from discussions of inequality in society. Within a color-blind society, majority groups also tend to disconnect from their own race as a way of absolving blame of harm caused by their place in a hierarchy. Color-blindness can be seen as a way to undermine minority hardships, as it used to argue that the United States is a meritocracy, in which people succeed only because they work hard and not their privilege. John R. Logan has disagreed with this notion of meritocracy, as the average black or Hispanic household earning more than $75,000 still live in a less affluent neighborhood than a white household earning less than $40,000 and poverty rates are higher for minorities.

Where the existence of majority-majority and majority-minority areas in the post-civil rights era were regarded as other than the result of racial discrimination, Bonilla-Silva countered other factors underlying residential segregation were ignored, such as the attitude of realtors, bankers, and sellers. Racial disparities once explained in terms of biology, began being discussed in terms of culture, including explanations such as "this race has too many babies". "Culture" in this framework is seen as something fixed and hard to change. One example form of rhetoric used in this framework is the argument, "if Irish, Jews (or other ethnic groups) have 'made it', how come black people have not?". Some no longer view racism as a problem under this belief and see government programs targeting race as no longer necessary due to the avoidance of racism. Bonilla-Silva describes naturalization as a frame that portrays racism as a natural outcome of individuals' choices, and "just the way things are". While Bonna-Silva himself disagrees with these as "minimization of racism", these are views common among supporters of racial color blindness.

Amy Ansell of Bard College argues that color-blindness in the United States and South Africa operates under the assumption that their societies are "post-race", where race no longer matters. She argues this is not true and if it was that race would not be taken into consideration even when trying to address inequality or remedy past wrongs.

Abstract liberalism utilizes themes from political and economic liberalism, such as meritocracy and the free market, to argue against the strong presence of racism in America. Some suggest it results in people being for equality in principle but against government action to implement equality, described by some sociologists as laissez-faire racism.

Robert D. Reason and Nancy J. Evans outline a similar description of color-blindness, which is based on the following beliefs:

1. Privilege is based on merit.
2. Most do not care about a person's race.
3. Social inequality is due to "cultural deficits" of individual people.
4. Given the previous three beliefs, there is no need to pay "systematic attention" to any current inequities.

Reason and Evans argue the prevalence of color-blindness is attributed to lack of knowledge or lack of exposure. They also argue that due to racial separation in housing and education many Americans lack direct contact with present racism.

In Social Inequality and Social Stratification in US Society, Christopher Doob argues that racial color blindness's proponents "assert...that they are living in a world where racial privilege no longer exists, but their behavior 'supports' racialized structures and practices". This assertion has allowed proponents of racial color blindness to define and separate themselves from racialized structures by using coded language, while also not needing to address race. Effectively, this argued for the separation of race and class in the beliefs of these proponents.

Eberhardt, Davies, Purdie-Vaughns, and Johnson studied implicit racial biases, suggesting people react differently to faces of members of their race compared to members of other races. They found a correlation between race and judicial outcomes and suggest a color blind approach may not actually be possible.

== Research ==
Fryer, Loury and Yuret argued that color-blind affirmative action has comparable efficiency cost to race-conscious affirmative action in the short run but is inefficient in the long term.

A 2010 study exposed students in an elementary school to color-blind ideology and found that those students were less likely to detect or report overt racial discrimination. The authors argued racial color blindness allows overt racism to persist."

Rodriguez found that color-blindness is used as a way for white Americans to justify adopting cultural symbols and signifiers belonging to people of color. This has been analyzed through white Americans appropriation of hip-hop culture using the method of participant observation. When looking at reasons for this behavior, it was found white Americans wanted to obtain characteristics of blackness commonly seen as 'cool.' Many white hip-hop consumers used color-blind reasoning that justified their participation in hip-hop culture and spaces, even when those spaces explicitly pointed out racial differences, in which they exhibited what Bonilla-Silva calls "race talk," where white people use specific rhetoric to address racial topics without explicitly mentioning race.

Amy Ansell, a sociologist at Bard College, has compared and contrasted the development of the color-blindness in the United States and South Africa. Given that white people are a minority population in South Africa and a majority population in the United States, Ansell expected to see a significant difference in the manifestation of color-blindness in both countries. The thirty-year time difference between the departure from Jim Crow and cessation of apartheid and differences in racial stratification and levels of poverty also led Ansell to expect a clear difference between the colorblindness ideology in the United States and South Africa. However, she concludes contemporary color-blindness in the two countries is nearly identical.

Vorauer, Gagnon, and Sasaki examined the effect that messages with a color-blind ideology had on white Canadians entering one-on-one interactions with Aboriginal Canadians. White Canadians who heard messages emphasizing color-blind ideology were much more likely to be concerned with ensuring the subsequent interaction did not go badly and were more likely hostile, uncomfortable, and uncertain. White participants who heard messages emphasizing multicultural ideology, or the valuing of people's differences, asked more positive questions focused on the other person more relaxedly.

== Alternatives ==
Researchers also offer alternatives to the color-blindness discourse. Reason and Evans call for people to become "racially cognizant" and continuously acknowledge the role that race plays in their lives. They argue it is important to balance personal identity and a person's race.

Researcher Jennifer Simpson argued that "in setting aside color blindness, White [people] must learn to see, accept...the possibility that some of the good, ease, or rewards they have experienced have not been solely the result of hard work" but from "a system biased in their favor." This conscious exploration of whiteness as a racial and social identity and the acknowledgment of the role of whiteness is connected to modern whiteness studies.

In a recent publication of the academic journal Communication Theory, Jennifer Simpson proposed a "more productive dialogue about race". New dialogue must take a more complex look at race, openly looking at different perspectives on race. Simpson argues white people must engage with other races in discussing the ongoing effects of racism, requiring white people to participate in "communicative behavior that may threaten simultaneously their sense of self and their material power in the social order".

== In education ==
A multisite case study of Atlantic State University, a primarily white institution, and Mid-Atlantic State University, a historically black college, explored color-blind ideologies among the institutions' white faculty members at the undergraduate and graduate level. In interviews with white faculty members at both institutions, researchers found these faculties often engaged with students from a color-blind perspective. Avoiding racial terms while implying their equivalent allowed white faculty to label minority students "as academically inferior, less prepared, and less interested in pursuing research and graduate studies while potentially ignoring structural causes" of inequity. The study concluded that color-blind ideology held by school faculty can reduce a student of color's perception of their academic abilities and potential to achieve success in STEM disciplines and in graduate school.

A case study of a suburban, mixed-race high school examined the trend toward color-blind ideology in schools among white faculty. It argued white schoolteachers' color-blind ideology often masks their fears of being accused of racism and prevents a deeper examination of race.

Case studies of three large school districts, (Boston, Massachusetts; Wake County, North Carolina; and Jefferson County, Louisville) found that the districts' race-neutral, or color-blind, policies to combat school segregation may disadvantage minorities and "reframe privilege as common sense" while ignoring structural inequalities.

== In U.S. Supreme Court opinions ==
In part, race in the United States is a legally-identifiable system reviewable by its courts. After the civil war, proponents of colorblindness sought to undermine race-based subordination that formed the core of discrimination and segregation via the new Equal Protection Clause, however state jurisdictions discovered the Constitution barred explicit discrimination but did not support integration. The Supreme Court used colorblind reasoning to shield against integration and uphold implicitly-racial state action until the Civil Rights Era when new harms were legally recognized. Cases in this century have moved to more directly adopt colorblind conception of the Equal Protection Clause, opposing race-based remedies to social inequality.

Color-blindness was first mentioned at the US Supreme Court with a dissenting opinion to Plessy v. Ferguson (1896) by Justice John Marshall Harlan who wrote that "Our Constitution is color-blind, and neither knows nor tolerates classes among citizens. In respect of civil rights, all citizens are equal before the law. The humblest is the peer of the most powerful. The law regards man as man, and takes no account of his surroundings or of his color when his civil rights as guaranteed by the supreme law of the land are involved." His opinion could thus be interpreted as saying that laws should not differentiate between people of different races. His opinion was not the majority-supported decision, which at the time was that laws requiring racial segregation were allowable, establishing the idea that "separate but equal" treatment was constitutionally acceptable.

More recently, the term color blind has appeared in Supreme Court opinions involving affirmative action, in opinions that support consideration of race when evaluating laws and their effects:

- In a concurring opinion of Regents v. Bakke (1978), Justices William J. Brennan Jr., Byron White, Thurgood Marshall, and Harry Blackmun objected to the color blind term, writing that "we cannot ... let color blindness become myopia which masks the reality that many 'created equal' have been treated within our lifetimes as inferior both by the law and by their fellow citizens."
- In her dissenting opinion to Gratz v. Bollinger (2003), Justice Ruth Bader Ginsburg quoted from a 1966 5th Circuit decision: "'The Constitution is both color blind and color conscious. To avoid conflict with the equal protection clause, a classification that denies a benefit, causes harm, or imposes a burden must not be based on race. In that sense, the Constitution is color blind. But the Constitution is color conscious to prevent discrimination being perpetuated and to undo the effects of past discrimination.'"
- In his concurring opinion to PICS v. Seattle (2007), Justice Clarence Thomas wrote that "the color-blind Constitution does not bar the government from taking measures to remedy past state-sponsored discrimination – indeed, it requires that such measures be taken in certain circumstances."
- In Students for Fair Admissions v. Harvard (2023), the Supreme Court ruled against affirmative action in college admissions, effectively overruling Grutter v. Bollinger (2003) and Regents v. Bakke (1978). In his concurring opinion, Justice Clarence Thomas affirmed his "defense of the colorblind Constitution" and argued that "all forms of discrimination based on race — including so-called affirmative action — are prohibited under the Constitution".

== See also ==
- Constitutional colorblindness
- Non-racialism
- Equalized odds
- Gender-blind
- Post-racial America
- Racecraft
- Racial essentialism
- Strategic essentialism
- White privilege
- Whiteness theory
