= Laissez-faire racism =

Sociological notion

Laissez-faire racism (from laissez-faire economics) is closely related to color blindness and covert racism, and is theorised to encompass an ideology that blames minorities for their poorer economic situations, viewing it as the result of cultural inferiority. The term is used largely by scholars of whiteness studies, who argue that laissez-faire racism has tangible consequences even though few would openly claim to be, or even believe they are, laissez-faire racists.

Lawrence D. Bobo, Professor of the Social Sciences at Harvard University, and Ryan Smith use this term to argue that the racial outlooks of white Americans have shifted from the more overtly racist Jim Crow attitudes – which endorsed school segregation, advocated for governmentally imposed discrimination, and embraced the idea that minorities were biologically inferior to whites – to a more subtle form of racism that continues to rationalize the ongoing problem of racial oppression in the United States. Laissez-faire racists claim to support equality while maintaining negative, stereotypical beliefs about minorities. The term 'laissez-faire' is borrowed from the French language, where it translates literally to "to leave to do" or substantively to "do nothing". The term therefore underscores the fact that laissez-faire racists can – and wish to – do nothing at all to actively end racism or racial inequality and this alone is enough to maintain the racially inegalitarian status quo.

Katherine Tarca writes that laissez-faire racism is the belief, stated or implied through actions, that one can end racial inequality and discrimination by refusing to acknowledge that race and racial discrimination exists. Laissez-faire racism has two main ideas: first, the belief in the melting pot and America's assertion of ideas of equal opportunity, regardless of race. Second, laissez-faire racism encompasses the ideology of how individual deficiencies explain the problems of entire social groups. Tarca explains that whites tend to view laissez-faire racism as being beneficial to people of color, while many minorities believe that these ideologies contrast and ignore the realities facing many minorities in America.

Eduardo Bonilla-Silva, who is a professor of sociology at Duke University, suggests that all groups of people in power construct these ideologies in order to justify social inequalities. For example, most racial ideologies today are more inclined to omit unfashionable racist language, which protects racial privilege by employing certain philosophies of liberalism in a more conceptual and decontextualized approach. These ideologies help to reinforce the existing condition of affairs by concentrating on cultural distinctions as the cause of the inferior accomplishments of minorities in education and employment. These ideas are primarily focused on the darker-skinned minorities, such as African Americans and Latinos. Ideologies like these refuse to acknowledge the systematic oppression, such as the continuing school segregation or persistent negative racial stereotypes that continue to surface in American society.

== Race ==
Many theorists continue to assert the idea that race is a social construct based on a person's physical appearance, which is not a matter of any actual biological differences between people, and is not a definable, meaningful or useful concept when applied to human beings because there is only one human race. Others respond that although this viewpoint may be biologically accurate, it leads nowhere in our understanding of race issues.

== Jim Crow ==
According to Katherine Tarca, contemporary racism, with laissez-faire racism being one of its components, has largely evolved from interrelated economic and political dynamics. Racism in the United States progressed from slavery-era evolutionary racism, to the Jim-Crow era of legal racial oppression. Jim Crow racism declined during the twentieth century, in part due to the Civil Rights Movement that challenged the notions of the biological inferiority of blacks. Tarca suggests that the end of Jim Crow laws did not end racism altogether, but led to another form of racism. "Old-fashioned racism", which asserted that blacks were biologically inferior, was mostly replaced from the 1940s to the 1980s with laissez-faire racism. This type of racism is characterized by stereotyping people of color and their communities, blaming them for being marginalized and opposing measures to address systemic racism. Laissez-faire racism of the post-civil rights era was formed through the successes of that movement, including the rejection of outright racist discourse. These advances, however, were moderated by the political and economic factors of the time. Political sentiment toward the Civil Rights Movement, predominantly the Civil Rights Act of 1964, relied on a particular interpretation of liberal theory. Liberalism in America since the Civil Rights Movement reaffirmed the belief in the impartial universal treatment of individuals, which led to the emphasis on individual merit and accomplishments. Opponents of laissez-faire racism claim that those who refuse to accept social explanations for inequality also oppose attempts to prevent it.

== Support of integration and equality ==
According to Bobo, the slow progression from Jim Crow to laissez-faire racism can be measured in the trends for questions on racial principles. These polls can help to provide the most descriptive evidence in the changes in racial sentiment in the United States. Surveys and polls conducted in 1942 show a continuing increase among whites who support racial integration and equal rights. In 1942, 68 percent of white Americans approved of school segregation, while only 7 percent approved this same position in 1985. Additionally, 55 percent of whites surveyed in 1944 thought whites should receive preference over blacks in access to jobs, compared with only 3 percent of whites in 1972. These same progressive attitudes in whites were extended to areas of interracial marriage, equal housing rights, and access to political office — although racial ideals tended to vary greatly amongst whites depending on geographical location, educational levels, age, and other factors.

== Resistance to social policy ==
These surveys sustain the idea that most white Americans support integration and racial equality. However, there tends to be pointed differences in the ideas between support for equality and the actual implementation of governmental policies that maintain these ideas. Bobo explains that in 1964, 64 percent of whites nationwide endorsed and supported the idea of integrated schools; however, only 38 percent felt that it was the responsibility of the federal government to implement these changes. By 1986, 93 percent of whites endorsed the principle, but only 26 percent endorsed government efforts to enforce school integration. Comparable examples can be seen in surveys with regard to equal access to employment and housing. In 1972, support for the equal access to jobs stood at 97 percent. However, support for federal programs to prevent employment discrimination reached 39 percent. Similarly, in 1976, 88 percent of whites supported the ideas that blacks should have the right to live wherever they pleased; but only 35 percent said they would vote for laws requiring homeowners to sell without regards to race. Extreme housing and school segregation continues to exist in America today.

== Meritocracy ==
According to George J. Sefa Dei, meritocracy is based on the idea that the United States is a merit based society where a person's worth and opportunities are solely based on individual effort and abilities. Laissez-faire racism supports the idea of rugged individualism and dismisses oppression on the basis of racial discrimination as attitudinally based and generally questionable. David Kelley's work contrasts this idea of "rugged individualism" with a more accurate picture of the "unrugged individualism" that allows for differentiation based on merit only in the voluntary sector of society, while still pointing out that society is not currently a meritocracy, so that meritocracy claims of those with state power cannot be held up as revealing all true merits on equal footing.

== Colorblind ==
Colorblindness refers to the idea that racial differences are unimportant in modern society. Bobo suggests that people who are colorblind claim they don't acknowledge, or care about, racial differences in people. These people refuse to acknowledge these contradictions and often claim that their choices are economical or based upon similarities, not racism.

Colorblind people often oppose affirmative action because it encourages racism against whites; claim that minorities are disadvantaged because of their own volition, accept racial segregation, and minimize racism and discrimination. According to Tarca, seventy-seven percent of the white respondents agreed with the statement "I am colorblind when it comes to race" in a survey taken on a college campus in 1992. Other studies have found that many whites who believe in the concept of colorblindness lack an understanding about how race shapes life experiences, mostly because whites often don't assign themselves to any particular race, choosing to identify themselves instead as being simply "American." The notion of colorblindness ignores the legacy of racial privilege in the United States. Whites are able to partake in the notion of colorblindness because they are largely unaware of how much that principle benefits them and burdens others.

Another one of the principle harms committed through laissez-faire racism has to do with the assertions that discourses dealing with race issues are unnecessary and impolite. The idea that race doesn't matter, refuses to acknowledge the realities of the lives of racialized people, and ignores the fact that, statistically, race plays an important role in education, incarceration rates and terms, as well as other factors.

== White privilege and laissez-faire racism ==
White privilege refers to rights or advantages given to white persons beyond the common rights and advantages of non-whites. According to Dei, it is through white privilege that differences in race continue to be defined. Many whites refuse to see the ways in which they continue to benefit from racist practices in the past and today. By refusing to acknowledge the hierarchy of race, class and gender in the United States, those in the position of dominance and power are able to downplay and ignore the realities of "oppression fashioned” prejudice (i.e., overt categorical hostility). It does not necessarily eliminate whites’ superior sense of group position. Even white individuals who have close Indigenous friends or spouses often express laissez-faire racism. Three mutually reinforcing social processes—subtyping, ideology-based homophily, and political avoidance norms—interact to sustain whites’ sense of group superiority and justifications for racial inequity. These processes are facilitated by historical and structural conditions, in this case colonization and small-town dynamics. Dei explains that some of the benefits of white privilege include: the positive effects linked to having one's own race extensively and positively represented in the media; the idea that for the most part, your skin color will not prevent you from obtaining housing and employment; and, the knowledge that you will never have to educate your children about what it means to be "different" or negatively represented in society. The laissez-faire ideas that race is not an issue helps to reinforce white privilege.

== Racial preferences and laissez-faire racism ==
According to Walter Allen, there were unfair racial preferences in an equal opportunity program that was widely implemented from 1965 to 1994. The program was designed to assist minorities and women in educational and career opportunities. Although the affirmative action program is primarily associated with the black community, it has been white females who have benefited most from the program, noting significant gains in all areas of education, employment, and contracting. Racial preferences have come under intense scrutiny for the past decade by those who don't see a need for the program, often calling it racist and accusing it of seeking to punish Asians and whites. The color-blind ideals would make racial preferences unnecessary because it is based on the idea that we live in a society where race is neither acknowledged nor important. Color-blind enthusiasts often use the idea of meritocracy to oppose affirmative action programs. However, according to Dei, these ideas fail to accept the long history of racism that has left its imprint on the lives and opportunities of minorities in the United States. Many people who express the laissez-faire attitude towards racism oppose racial preferences on the grounds that they highlight differences in society when we should focus on making America more colorblind, asserting that they believe in equal rights for minorities, and oppose racial discrimination.

== Symbolic racism ==
Symbolic racism, which is a term connected with the work of David O. Sears, Professor of Psychology and Political Science at UCLA, and his associate Donald Kinder, is a mix of racist ideals combined with the traditional American moral standards connected with Protestant ethical values. These ideals are concerned with moral character and behavior in association with the belief in individualism.

According to Silva, many researchers have criticized the concept of symbolic racism because it asserts the theory that the "anti-black" affect and individualism is new. These critics believe that laissez-faire racism should not be confused with "symbolic racism."

Lawrence D. Bobo defines symbolic racism as a form of learned social values that involve the Protestant ethic and anti-black sentiments and fears in a framework where overt segregation and biological racism are less severe. Bobo's concept of laissez-faire racism differs from symbolic racism in three respects.

First, Bobo states that laissez-faire racism deals with the historical analysis of the political and economic modification of race in America. Bobo claims that symbolic racism researchers have not effectively dealt with or explained why what they call old-fashioned racism declined or why symbolic racism adopts the specific form and perspective that it does today.

Second, Bobo states that symbolic racism is also explicitly based on the idea of the sociocultural theory of prejudice, which places its central meaning on the "psychological affective" nature of racist attitudes. Laissez-faire racism, on the other hand, is based on the sociological theory of prejudice.

Third, Bobo believes that symbolic racism deals with the idea that blacks do not work hard enough, are trying to take what they have not earned, and focuses on the individual and individual character traits, while laissez-faire racism is based on prevalent social or economic patterns.

== See also ==
- African-American history
- Civil rights movement (1896–1954)
- Apartheid
- Baseball color line
- Black Belt (region of Chicago)
- Black flight
- Civil rights
- Covert racism
- Desegregation
- Discrimination
- Ethnopluralism
- Housing Segregation
- Jim Crow laws
- List of anti-discrimination acts
- Microaggression
- Mortgage Discrimination
- Race and health
- Race card
- Race legislation in the United States
- Racial segregation
- Racial segregation in the United States
- Racism
- Redlining
- Second-class citizen
- Separate but equal
- Timeline of the civil rights movement
- White flight
