= God in the Dock =

1970 collection of essays by C. S. Lewis

- First edition
- Author: C. S. Lewis
- Language: English
- Subject: Christianity
- Publisher: Eerdmans
- Publication date: 1970
- Publication place: United Kingdom
- Media type: Print
- Pages: 346
- ISBN: 0-8028-1456-5
- OCLC: 32880490

God in the Dock is a collection of previously unpublished essays and speeches from C. S. Lewis, collected from many sources after his death. Its title implies "God on Trial" (Note: The English phrase "in the dock": in criminal cases in English courts, the accused is placed in the "dock"—a half height open-topped box.) and the title is based on an analogy made by Lewis suggesting that modern human beings, rather than seeing themselves as standing before God in judgement, prefer to place God on trial while acting as his judge.

This book was originally published in the United Kingdom as Undeceptions: Essays on Theology and Ethics, while a shorter book, published by Fontana in 1979 and entitled God in the Dock: Essays on Theology, does not include many of the essays in this larger collection.

== Three sections ==
The editor states in the book's preface that the collection is a "very mixed bag". They are divided by the editor into Part I - "clearly theological", Part II - "semi-theological", Part III - "basic theme is 'ethics', and Part IV - "letters arranged in the chronological order in which they were published".

=== Groundwork ===
The collection covers a wide range of topics but focuses primarily on Lewis' view of Christianity. The book is split into three sections, the first of which contains essays such as "Myth Became Fact", "The Grand Miracle", and "Is Theism Important?". These articles lay the groundwork for Lewis' apologetics, essentially establishing a starting point at which the true discrepancies between Christians and non-Christians become clear.

=== Argument ===
The second section of God in the Dock builds on that starting point and presents a persuasive argument for Christianity. In articles including "Revival or Decay?" and "Modern Translations of the Bible", Lewis defends authentic Christianity and draws a distinct line between Truth and Religion.

Lewis had already noted a distinct split between the religious and secular observance of Christmas. In Xmas and Christmas: A Lost Chapter from Herodotus, Lewis relates as satire the observance of two simultaneous holidays in "Niatirb" (Britain backwards) from the supposed view of the Greek historian and traveller. One, "Exmas", is observed by a flurry of compulsory commercial activity and expensive indulgence in alcoholic beverages. The other, "Crissmas," is observed in Niatirb's temples. Lewis's narrator asks a priest "why they kept Crissmas on the same day as Exmas?" He receives the reply:

It is not lawful, O Stranger, for us to change the date of Crissmas, but would that Zeus would put it into the minds of the Niatirbians to keep Exmas at some other time or not to keep it at all. For Exmas and the Rush distract the minds even of the few from sacred things. And we indeed are glad that men should make merry at Crissmas; but in Exmas there is no merriment left. And when I asked him why they endured the Rush, he replied, "It is, O Stranger, a racket..."

In the chapter "Evil and God," Lewis refers to "mellontolatry", or the worship of the future. He considers this to be unproductive IF the future is simply where the world is going, that is, a random walk. He believes that the world can hardly congratulate itself for having "arrived" at a future that is simply a place it has got to, if that is all that it is - Lewis in fact argues that there is more purpose than that, but that some choose to worship that alone.

Lewis also address those skeptical of the Resurrection of Jesus. Even if one interprets the crucifixion of Jesus as a strictly historical event, this doesn't preclude its subsequent mythologization. But neither does it negate its historicity. The claim of the Gospel writers is that Jesus' resurrection is a specific historical event.

The heart of Christianity is a myth which is also a fact. The old myth of the Dying God, without ceasing to be myth, comes down from the heaven of legend and imagination to the earth of history. It happens—at a particular date, in a particular place, followed by definable historical consequences. We pass from a Balder or an Osiris, dying nobody knows when or where, to a historical Person crucified (it is all in order) under Pontius Pilate. By becoming fact it does not cease to be myth: that is the miracle.

=== Specifics ===
The final section of the book focuses on specifics. It addresses the logical fallacy Lewis named "Bulverism" as well as issues concerning religious observances such as Christmas. It answers some of the questions non-Christians have about Christianity.

These essays are not actually logically connected; rather, they have been collected together from various sources, by an editor not by the author. Some essays may have fit into other sections, but are organised by the collector of the essays as they are—posthumously.
