= Roger Clegg =

American lawyer

Roger Clegg is a member of the board of directors of the Center for Equal Opportunity, where he previously served as president and general counsel. Prior to joining the CEO, Clegg served in a variety of capacities within both the Reagan and George H. W. Bush administrations, including a position as deputy assistant attorney general in both administrations, assistant to the solicitor general, associate deputy attorney general and acting assistant attorney general in the Office of Legal Policy. He is a graduate of Rice University and Yale University.
