= George Dei =

Ghanaian-Canadian researcher

George Jerry Sefa Dei is a professor at Ontario Institute for Studies in Education of the University of Toronto. He is known for his anti-racist research, particularly on anti-racist approaches to education. He is also known for his advocacy for African-focused schools in Canada. In 2007, he was installed as the chief (Adumakwaahene) of the town of Asokore, Ghana. He was elected as fellows of the Royal Society of Canada in 2017.

== Selected works ==
- Dei, George Jerry Sefa, Schooling and Education in Africa: The Case of Ghana. Africa World Press, 2004
- Dei, George Jerry Sefa, Removing the Margins: The Challenges and Possibilities of Inclusive Schooling. Canadian Scholars' Press, 2000
- Dei, George Jerry Sefa, ed. Reconstructing 'dropout': A critical ethnography of the dynamics of black students' disengagement from school. University of Toronto Press, 1997.
- Dei, George Jerry Sefa. Anti-racism education: Theory and practice. Fernwood Pub., 1996.
