= Tinder (app) =

American online dating app

- ㅤ⠀⠀⠀⠀⠀⠀⠀⠀
- Founded: 2012; 14 years ago
- Headquarters: West Hollywood, California, US
- Area served: 190 countries
- Owner: Match Group
- Founders: Sean Rad; Justin Mateen; Whitney Wolfe; Jonathan Badeen
- CEO: Spencer Rascoff (interim)
- Industry: Software
- Employees: 460
- Website: tinder.com

Tinder
- Developers: Tinder, Inc.
- Release: September 12, 2012; 14 years ago
- Operating system: iOS, Android, Web, Wear OS, WatchOS, tvOS
- Available in: 60 languages
- List of languages: Arabic; Afrikaans; Basque; Bengali; Bulgarian; Catalan; Croatian; Danish; Dutch; English; Estonian; Finnish; French; Georgian; German; Greek; Hindi; Hebrew; Hungarian; Indonesian; Italian; Japanese; Khmer; Korean; Latvian; Lithuanian; Macedonian; Malay; Norwegian; Polish; Portuguese; Romanian; Russian; Serbian; Simplified Chinese; Slovak; Spanish; Swedish; Tagalog; Tamil; Telugu; Thai; Traditional Chinese; Turkish; Ukrainian; Vietnamese
- Website: tinder.com

Tinder operates a platform for online dating and geosocial networking accessible via Web site and mobile app. It was launched in 2012 and is owned by Match Group. It is available in 190 countries and 60 languages. It has a minimum age requirement of 18. Tinder uses a freemium model; the platform is free, but users must pay for additional functions and features. In 2025, the platform had 75 million monthly active users, including 9 million paying users, and generated $1.862 billion in revenue and $832 million in operating income. Along with Bumble and Hinge, Tinder is one of the most popular dating apps worldwide.

To use the service, Tinder users create a profile with photos, a short biography, and list of interests and then "swipe right" to "like" or "swipe left" to "dislike" other users' profiles. The platform uses a "double opt-in" system, also called "matching", where two users must "like" each other before they can exchange messages; the selections a user makes are not known to other users, unless two users swipe right on each other's profiles.

== History ==
=== 2012: Prototype and launch ===
In January 2012, Sean Rad was hired as general manager of Cardify, a credit card loyalty app launched by Hatch Labs, a startup incubator owned by IAC in West Hollywood, California. During a hackathon in his first month, he presented the idea for a dating app called Matchbox. Rad and engineer Joe Munoz built the prototype for MatchBox and presented the app on February 16, 2012. The app was owned as a joint venture between its founders and IAC subsidiary Match Group.

Since the name MatchBox was too similar to Match.com, the app was renamed as Tinder. The company's flame-themed logo remained consistent throughout the rebranding.

In March, co-founder Jonathan Badeen (front-end operator and later Tinder's CSO), and Chris Gulczynski (designer and later Tinder's CCO) joined Cardify.

In May 2012, while Cardify was going through Apple's App Store approval process, the team focused on MatchBox. During the same period, Alexa Mateen (Justin's sister) and her friend Whitney Wolfe Herd were hired as Cardify sales reps.

In August 2012, Cardify was abandoned, Matchbox was renamed Tinder, and co-founder Justin Mateen (marketer and later Tinder's CMO) joined the company.

Tinder has been credited with popularizing the swipe feature many companies now use. Tinder's selection function, which was initially click-based, evolved into the company's swipe feature. The feature was established when Rad and Badeen, interested in gamification, modeled the feature on a deck of cards. Badeen then streamlined the action after a trial on a bathroom mirror.

In September 2012, Tinder was soft-launched in the App Store. In July 2013, it was launched for Android.

In 2013, Tinder won the "Best New Startup of 2013" award by TechCrunch.

=== 2013-2016 ===
In October 2013, security researchers found and reported a flaw which allowed users' locations to be exposed; according to them, Tinder did not respond until December. According to a Tinder spokesperson, "the issue was resolved 'within 48 hours'".

In March 2014, Tinder launched verified profiles for public figures, so that celebrities and other public figures can verify their identities.

In August 2014, "The Barn" internship program of Bartle Bogle Hegarty (BBH) used Tinder profiles to promote its NYC Puppy Rescue Project.

By October 2014, Tinder users completed over one billion swipes per day, producing about 12 million matches per day. By then, Tinder's average user generally spent about 90 minutes a day on the app. An article in The New York Times attributed the wide use of Tinder not to what Tinder was doing right but to flaws in the models of earlier dating software, which relied on mathematical algorithms to select potential partners. Relationship experts said that users used the photos that come in succession on the app to derive cues as to social status, confidence levels, and personal interests.

Rad served as Tinder's CEO until March 2015, when he was replaced by former eBay and Microsoft executive Chris Payne. Rad returned as CEO in August 2015.

Tinder launched its subscription version, Tinder Plus, in March 2015, with the functionality enabling limitless matches, whereas the free Tinder app restricts the number of right swipes in a 12-hour period.

In 2015, Tinder released its "Rewind" function and its "Super Like" function and retired its Tinder "Moments" and "Last Active" feature.

In January 2015, Tinder acquired Chill, the developer of Tappy, a mobile messenger that uses "images and ephemerality".

In April 2015, Tinder revealed its first sponsored ad promoting Budweiser's next #Whatever, USA campaign.

In November 2015, Tinder added optional work and education information to user profiles.

In April 2016, Tinder was the most popular dating app in the United States, holding a 25.6% market share of monthly users.

In August 2016, two engineers found a flaw that showed all users' matches' exact locations. The location was updated every time a user logged into the app, even for blocked matches. The issue was detected in March 2016 and fixed in August 2016.

In October 2016, the company also launched its "Boost" functionality in Australia.

In October 2016, Tinder announced the opening of its first office in Silicon Valley with the goal of more effectively recruiting technical employees.

In November 2016, Tinder introduced more options for gender selection.

In December 2016, Blatt became interim CEO of Tinder, replacing Sean Rad, who became chairman.

=== 2017: Merger with Match ===
In September 2017, Tinder surpassed Netflix as the highest-grossing app on the Apple App Store.

In March 2017, Tinder launched Tinder Online, a version of Tinder for the World Wide Web.

In July 2017, Match Group converted stock options held by the founders of Tinder into options in Match Group, thereby consolidating Tinder. The transaction implied a valuation of $3 billion for Tinder.

In July 2017, a study published in Advances in Intelligent Systems and Computing found that Tinder users are excessively willing to disclose their personally identifiable information. In September 2017, a journalist requested all data that the Tinder app had recorded about her from the company and found that Tinder stores all user messages, user locations and times, the characteristics of users who interest a particular user, the characteristics of particular users of interest to other users, and the length of time users spend looking at particular pictures, which for the journalist amounted to 800 pages of detail.

In September 2017, Tinder launched an additional subscription service, Tinder Gold, that allows subscribers to see which users "swiped back" without alerting those users. It also includes Passport, Rewind, Unlimited Likes, Likes You, five Super Likes per day, one Boost per month, and more profile controls.

CEO Blatt resigned from Match Group and Tinder in 2017 after allegations of sexual harassment. He was replaced by Elie Seidman.

=== 2018–2019 ===
In April 2018, Tinder began testing "Tinder Loops", its first video-based feature.

In August 2018, Tinder launched Tinder University, a feature that allows college students to connect with other students on their campus and at nearby schools.

In May 2019, it was reported that Tinder was planning for a lighter version of the app, Tinder Lite, aimed at growing markets where data usage, bandwidth and storage space are a concern.

In June 2019, the Government of Russia demanded that Tinder provide it with photos and messages of its users.

=== 2020 ===
In January 2020, Tinder enabled a panic button and anti-catfishing technology to improve user safety. If something goes wrong on a date, a user can hit a panic button, transmit accurate location data, and call emergency services. To use this feature, users must download and install the Noonlight app. Also, before meeting in person, users are required to take selfies to prove their photos in Tinder profiles match their real identities.

In March 2020, due to the COVID-19 lockdowns, Tinder temporarily made its Passport feature available for free to all its users worldwide. Previously this feature had been only accessible to users who had purchased a subscription.

In August 2020, Tinder revealed plans for its Tinder Platinum subscription plan, which gives users access to more features for a higher price than gold. The same month, Jim Lanzone took over as CEO.

In September 2020, the Pakistani government announced that it would ban five dating apps, including Tinder, because the apps provided "immoral or indecent content" that does not comply with Pakistani law.

Also in September 2020, Tinder relaunched Swipe Night, an interactive series where users make decisions following a storyline. Swipe Night had previously been launched in October 2019. It was slated to be launched internationally in March 2020, but it was postponed until September due to the COVID-19 pandemic.

In December 2020, Tinder announced a partnership with Megan Thee Stallion for the Put Yourself Out There Challenge, giving $10,000 to users who made unique profiles.

=== 2021-present ===
In February 2021, Tinder launched mobile accessories under the brand name Tinder Made.

In March 2021, Tinder gave away COVID-19 testing kits to some matches as COVID-19 lockdowns ended.

In March 2021, Tinder partnered with and invested $1.5 million in Garbo, a nonprofit background check company, to add a feature enabling users to run background checks on their matches to determine criminal records. The move was controversial due to alleged errors and alleged racial discrimination in the criminal justice system. Tinder ended its partnership with Garbo in 2023.

In June 2021, Tinder added an online speed dating game.

In August 2021, Tinder began requiring use of an identity verification service to mitigate catfishing on the platform.

In September 2021, Lanzone resigned as chief executive to pursue a new role at Yahoo. Tinder named Renate Nyborg its new CEO, its first female CEO.

In December 2021, Tinder began working on a metaverse called Tinderverse, a shared virtual reality and Tinder Coins, an in-app currency users can earn as a reward for good behavior, allowing them to pay for the platform's premium services.

In July 2022, Tinder announced a partnership with the campaign group No More in an attempt to protect its users against domestic violence, especially women, who are more vulnerable, to educate users about safe dating.

In May 2023, Tinder ended operations in Russia in response to the 2022 Russian invasion of Ukraine.

In 2023, Tinder introduced Tinder Matchmaker, which allows a user's friends and family to access their Tinder account and suggest potential partners. According to Tinder, the addition of a feature that allows friends to select compatible matches makes online dating safer.

In November 2023, Tinder added profile prompts and basic info tags, similar to Bumble and Hinge.

In January 2024, Match Group named Faye Iosotaluno as chief executive officer of Tinder.

In February 2024, Tinder ceased operations in Belarus. Belarusian security forces had used Tinder to identify people who attended protests against president Alexander Lukashenko.

In April 2024, Tinder added a "Share My Date" safety feature, which allows users to share information about their date, including location, date, time, and a photo of their match, to friends and family.

In May 2025, Tinder developers added a paid option to filter users by person's height.

In June 2025, Tinder added a feature to help find double dates with friends.

In September 2025, Tinder introduced new "Dating Modes," evolving some of its existing features into structured experiences tailored for different types of connections. The update reorganized tools including Tinder’s "Blind Date" and other thematic interactions under this new framework, aiming to give users more intentional ways to navigate matches.

In November 2025, Tinder began testing a feature that uses artificial intelligence to analyze users' camera rolls to determine their interests.

In April 2026, Tinder began giving verified users a "Verified Human" badge on their profile, following the expansion of a biometric identity verification integration to global markets, including the United States, developed with World, an identity verification platform created by Tools for Humanity. The feature followed a 2025 pilot of the system with Tinder users in Japan. During the pilot, users who verified their identity at a World Orb device received a badge on their Tinder profile indicating that a real person was behind the account.

== Legal issues ==
In June 2014, former vice president of marketing Whitney Wolfe filed a sexual harassment and sex discrimination suit in Los Angeles County Superior Court against IAC-owned Match Group, Tinder's parent company. The lawsuit alleged that Rad and Mateen had engaged in discrimination, sexual harassment, and retaliation against her, while Tinder's corporate supervisor, IAC's Sam Yagan, did nothing. IAC suspended Mateen from his position pending an ongoing investigation, and stated that it "acknowledges that Mateen sent private messages containing inappropriate content, but it believes Mateen, Rad and the company are innocent of the allegations". The suit was settled with no admission of wrongdoing, and Wolfe reportedly received over $1 million in the settlement.

In March 2018, Match Group sued Bumble, arguing that it was guilty of patent infringement and of stealing trade secrets from Tinder. In June 2020, an undisclosed settlement was reached between Match Group and Bumble to settle all litigations.

In December 2018, Tinder dismissed its vice president of marketing and communication, Rosette Pambakian. Pambakian alleged former Match Group and IAC CEO Greg Blatt sexually assaulted her in a hotel room after a company party in December 2016. She further accused the company of firing her when she reported the incident.

In August 2018, Rad, Mateen, and eight other former and current Tinder executives filed suit against Match Group and IAC, alleging that they manipulated the 2017 valuation of the company to deny them billions of dollars they were owed. They alleged that Match Group and IAC executives deliberately manipulated the data given to the banks, overestimating expenses and underestimating potential revenue growth, to keep the 2017 valuation artificially low. Tinder's 2017 valuation was set at $3 billion, unchanged from a valuation that had been done two years earlier, despite rapid growth in revenue and subscribers. The plaintiffs sought more than $2 billion in damages. In December 2021, Match Group and the plaintiffs settled for $441 million.

There have been several cases of transgender users being reported and banned on Tinder. This led to a lawsuit in March 2018. However, despite promised efforts by Tinder for inclusion, the practice of banning transgender users allegedly continued.

In May 2015, a class action lawsuit was filed alleging that Tinder engaged in ageism by charging higher fees for users above the age of 29. In September 2025, to settle the case, Tinder agreed to pay $60.5 million and agreed to end pricing based on age in most markets.

== Statistics ==
=== Finances ===
Tinder revenue and paying users
Year	Revenue in billions of US$	Paying users in millions
2025	1.840	8.9
2024	1.941	9.6
2023	1.918	10.4
2022	1.794	10.9
2021	1.650	9.6
2020	1.410	8.2
2019	1.150	7.0
2018	0.805	3.7
2017	0.403	2.0
2016	0.169	1.1
2015	0.047	0.3

=== Demographics ===
Tinder age demographics in the U.S.
Age group	Percentage of users
18-24	35%
25-34	25%
35-44	20%
45-54	8%
55+	10%

Tinder gender demographics in the U.S.
Gender	Percentage of users
Male	73%
Female	27%

== User behavior ==
=== Online dating apps: higher usage by men than women ===
Men use dating apps and websites more than women do, both by frequency of use and number of users.

A study published in 2016 showed that "men tend to like a large proportion of the women they view but receive only a tiny fraction of matches in return—just 0.6 percent", while women are much more selective about swiping but match at a 10% higher rate than men. The study also found that women are more engaged, take longer to compose their messages, and write longer messages.

According to University of Texas at Austin psychologist David Buss, "Apps like Tinder and OkCupid give people the impression that there are thousands or millions of potential mates out there. One dimension of this is the impact it has on men's psychology. When there is ... a perceived surplus of women, the whole mating system tends to shift towards short-term dating," and there is a feeling of disconnect when choosing future partners. The appearance of an abundance of potential partners may cause online daters to be less likely to choose a partner and be less satisfied with their choices of partners. Data released by Tinder in 2018 showed that of the 1.6 billion swipes it records per day, 26 million result in matches (a match rate of approximately 1.63%).

=== Reasons for use ===
A study in 2017 based on a 58-item questionnaire found 13 major reasons why people use Tinder, including entertainment, passing time, socializing, sexual experience, relationship seeking, self-esteem boosting, curiosity, travel, social pressure, forgetting an ex, improving skills, friendship, and convenience, moving beyond just romance or sex.

==== Tinder Tourism ====
"Tinder Tourism" is the use of the platform while traveling to find a companion to avoid isolation, tour guide, relationship, or casual hookup. It is more popular with women, for whom solo travel is more dangerous.

==== Use as a hookup service ====
In August 2015, journalist Nancy Jo Sales wrote in Vanity Fair that Tinder operates within a culture of users seeking sex without relationships. In 2017, the Department of Communications Studies at the Texas Tech University College of Media & Communication conducted a study to see how infidelity was connected to Tinder. The experiment was conducted on 550 students from an unnamed university in the southwestern United States. The students first provided their demographic information and then answered questions about Tinder's link to infidelity. The results showed that more than half reported having seen somebody on Tinder they knew was in an exclusive relationship (63.9%), while 73.1% of participants reported that they knew male friends who used Tinder while in a relationship, and 56.1% reported that they had female friends who used Tinder while in a relationship. Psychologists Douglas T. Kenrick, Sara E. Gutierres, Laurie L. Goldberg, Steven Neuberg, Kristin L. Zierk, and Jacquelyn M. Krones have demonstrated experimentally that after exposure to photos of or stories about desirable potential mates, people decrease their ratings of commitment to their partners. David Buss has estimated that approximately 30% of men on Tinder are married.

=== Importance of photos for user success ===
Before Tinder, most online dating services matched people according to their autobiographical information, such as interests, hobbies, and future plans. Tinder places a higher weight on photos. For social scientists studying Human mating strategies, Tinder offers a much simpler environment than its predecessors. In a 2016 study analyzing Tinder users' behavior in New York City and London, researchers created with three profiles using stock photography, two with actual photographs of volunteers, one with no photos, and one that was apparently deactivated. All pictures were of people of average physical attractiveness. These profiles then liked all profiles presented to them, and then counted the number of returning likes. The researchers found that men liked a large proportion of the profiles they viewed, but received returning likes only 0.6% of the time, while women were much more selective but received matches 10% of the time. Men received matches at a much slower rate than women. Once they received a match, women were far more likely than men to send a message, 21% compared to 7%, but took more time to do so. Tyson and his team found that for the first two-thirds of messages from each sex, women sent them within 18 minutes of receiving a match compared to five minutes for men. Men's first messages had an average of 12 characters and were typical simple greetings; by contrast, initial messages by women averaged 122 characters.

By sending out questionnaires to frequent Tinder users, the researchers discovered that the reason men tended to like a large proportion of the women they saw was to increase their chances of a match. This led to a feedback loop in which men liked more and more of the profiles they saw, while women could afford to be more selective in liking profiles because of a greater probability of a match. The feedback loop's mathematical limit occurs when men like all profiles they see while women find a match whenever they like a profile. It was not known whether some evolutionarily stable strategy has emerged, nor has Tinder revealed such information.

Tyson and his team found that even though the men-to-women ratio of their data set was approximately one, the male profiles received 8,248 matches while the female profiles received 532, because the vast majority of the matches for both the male and female profiles came from male profiles, with 86% of the matches for the male profiles alone coming from other male profiles, leading the researchers to conclude that gay men were "far more active in liking than heterosexual women." On the other hand, the deactivated male account received all of its matches from women. The researchers were not sure why that happened.

== See also ==
- Timeline of online dating
- Comparison of online dating services
