= Dana R. Carney =

American psychologist

Dana R. Carney is an American psychologist. She is associate professor of business at the Haas School of Business at the University of California, Berkeley. She is a Barbara and Gerson Bakar Faculty Fellow, an affiliate of the Department of Psychology and the director of the Institute of Personality and Social Research at the University of California, Berkeley.

== Education and research ==
Carney's field of study is nonverbal communication, power and status, and racial bias and discrimination. She has published over 50 articles on these topics in her ten years as a faculty member. Prior to serving on the faculty at UC Berkeley she was an assistant professor at Columbia University's Graduate School of Business. Previous to Columbia she spent time as a postdoctoral fellow at Harvard in the Psychology Department working with Mahzarin Banaji, Wendy Berry Mendes, and Moshe Bar. She received her PhD in experimental psychology from Northeastern University working with Judith A. Hall and C. Randall Colvin. She also received a master's degree at California State University, Fullerton working with Jinni A. Harrigan and Ronald E. Riggio and a B.A. from the University of San Francisco working with Maureen O'Sullivan.

== Power poses ==
Carney is the primary author of the power pose phenomenon popularized by Amy Cuddy. The idea of power posing builds on a paper Carney published in 2005 called "Beliefs about the nonverbal expression of social power" and a finding called the facial feedback hypothesis (which has come under some scrutiny for possibly being a false positive finding; however a recent paper suggests the facial feedback hypothesis may be a true phenomenon after all). After many failed replications of Carney's power pose work, Carney posted a note on her personal website explaining that she no longer believed in the effects of power posing on feelings, hormones, and risk-taking behavior. This "position on power poses" note contributed to the discussion of replicability in psychological science by Carney being among a first recent batch of scientists publicly disclosing they did not, after failed replications, have faith in their own research. Carney was applauded for her willingness to disclose her doubts.
