= Continuum model of impression formation =

Model in social psychology

In social psychology, the continuum model of impression formation was created by Fiske and Neuberg.

According to this model of impression formation, impressions are formed when individuals automatically categorize others into social categories. Upon categorization, individuals' responses to others are usually based on the activated emotions, cognitions, and behaviors that they associate with that social category. However, with sufficient motivation and resources, individuals can choose to ignore their stereotypes, get to know the person, and judge them based on learned individuating factors.

== Historical context ==
The continuum model's central statement dates back to 1982, where Fiske proposed "schema-triggered affect" accounts for immediate evaluations made during social interactions and the effect associated with spontaneous social categorization. The development of the model came from a grant proposal in 1984 that became the basis for a chapter written by Fiske and Pavelchak, which described the empirical support for the schema-triggered affect and compared it to the category-based models. Over the next four years Fiske and Neuberg developed the full model in detail, explaining the sequence of the stages in detail, as well as compared it to the existing literature. The core concept of the model was the contradiction between the existing literature of impression formation and social cognition. The impression formation literature took an elemental and algebraic approach, whereas social cognition took a more holistic and configural approach.

The elemental approach to impression formation suggests that when individuals are making impressions they weigh the average of the isolated characteristics of a target individual. This approach developed by Anderson did well at predicting individuals evaluations of the target individual, but showed individuals characteristics as fixed and unchanged by other characteristics or factors.

The configural approaches suggested that the target's characteristics could be viewed differently based on other characteristics they possessed. The continuum model synthesized these two approaches by proposing that people can use a range of processes to develop an impression. The use of these different processes depends on two main factors: the available information and the perceiver's motivation.

== Processes ==
The steps of the model include: initial categorization, personal relevance, attention allocation, confirmatory categorization, recategorization, piecemeal integration, public expression, and further assessment.

=== Initial categorization ===
When encountering an individual for the first time, the perceiver requires sufficient information to place that individual into an existing social category. This categorization happens almost instantly and automatically, and is usually based on salient features, such as gender, age, and ethnicity. Once the target has been categorized, thoughts and feelings consistent with how the individual feels towards that particular social category are triggered. However, it is up to the individual to decide whether these triggered thoughts and feelings guide their behaviour.

=== Personal relevance ===
Whether or not the perceiver adjusts their initial impression is determined by personal relevance. In the original model, personal relevance is synonymous with motivational relevance. If the perceiver is intrigued by the individual or if the individual is not irrelevant to them, the perceiver then becomes motivated to attend to more individuating characteristics and change the impression that resulted from initial categorization. If the individual is not relevant or interesting, or if at any point the perceiver loses their motivation, the perceiver will maintain their impression and not continue through the model.

=== Attention allocation ===
If the individual is of personal relevance to the perceiver, then the perceiver must focus their attention on additional information related to the target. However, in order to do this, the perceiver must have the sufficient resources, such as the time and energy, to continue through the model. If at any time the perceiver depletes their resources, they will stop the process and exit the model. If the perceiver has sufficient motivation they will continue through the model.

=== Confirmatory categorization ===
Stereotyping is easier than attempting to use individuating processes, so the perceiver will try to assimilate additional information about the individual into the pre-existing category. If this is successful, the perceiver's attitude toward the individual will be based on the initial categorization. If the individual's traits are inconsistent and cannot be assimilated into the initial category, then the perceiver will continue through the model to recategorization.

There are certain conditions under which the perceiver will be more likely to view the individual on stereotypic or individuated terms. For example, if the perceiver feels threatened or needs to justify their power over the individual, then they will more likely attend to information consistent with the initial category; if the perceiver needs the individual to accomplish a shared goal, then they will be more likely to attend to individuating information.

=== Recategorization ===
Once information inconsistent with the initial category is obtained, recategorization occurs. It involves the perceiver trying to find a more suited category for the individual that includes the additional information.

One way to do this is through subcategories, where the perceiver may adjust the initial category to include the additional information. An exemplar may also be used where the perceiver compares the individual to someone who they know and is similar to the individual. Additionally, the perceiver may compare the individual to his or her self. Otherwise, the perceiver may need to switch the individual into a completely different category. All forms of recategorization are believed to be comparable and lead to the same relative outcome.

Upon successful recategorization, new attitudes are often formed that are influenced by the new category. If the perceiver cannot recategorize the individual, then they will move on to the next process in the model: piecemeal integration.

=== Piecemeal integration ===
This is the most individuating stage. An overall assessment is created when the perceiver takes into account all of the perceived attributes of the target. Now the initial category simply becomes one of the attributes summed to form the impression of the individual. This process results in a new attitude being formed towards the individual. Perceivers will get to this stage not only when they cannot place the individual into a pre-existing category, but also when perceivers have to screen people or hire people for positions such as jobs.

=== Public expression ===
This last stage is where the individual decides (either consciously or unconsciously) to express their formed attitude toward the individual. This is where one often sees the expression of prejudice, stereotypes, or discrimination. Public expression may occur at any stage in model whether or not a final impression is present.

=== Further assessment ===
Impression formation is a dynamic process. Even once perceivers have reached the final stage, they may loop back up to the attention allocation stage when new information causes them to rethink their current categorization. However, perceivers now try to assimilate the new information into their current category instead of the initial one. If they fail to do so, then they move through the continuum model once again, trying to find a new, acceptable category to place the individual in.

== Serial and parallel processes ==
Serial processing refers to the nature of processing in a solely sequential order. As soon as one item has been completed, then the next item can begin being processed. On the other hand, parallel processing allows for multiple items to be processed simultaneously, but the time required for such processing may vary from item to item. The continuum model includes both serial and parallel processing because it acknowledges in the interplay between the social perceiver and the information acquired from a target.

In 1996, Kunda and Thagard proposed a parallel-constraint-satisfaction theory of impression formation, which focuses on social stereotypes, target traits, and behaviors that influence the impressions people form. Kunda and Thagard contrasted their theory with the continuum model, criticizing the continuum model for its "alleged serial nature" as well as the "priority given to social stereotype information over individuating information."

The alleged differences between the two models are much less significant than they appear. The Kunda–Thagard model provides a mechanism where the features of a target can constrain the meaning of other features as a way of capturing the flow from categorization to recategorization in a more dynamic way, as well as gives consideration to how the response of a target may be different, despite given identical information. The continuum model argues that the influencing factors, which categorizes targets, connects the motivational and attention aspects of the model, bringing target information serially into the system. The continuum model also shows that different features of a target shapes how it is organized into social categories. Certain features, such as race or gender, are usually predominant because of their visual accessibility.

Both models have strengths in different areas but a combination of the two would move beyond the debate between which is most important, serial or parallel processing, and allow both to be used together. Although both models have merit in the way they predict the processing of information, the dynamic nature of the continuum model and its integration of serial and parallel processing makes it the most comprehensive model for predicting impressions.
