= Power posing =

Practise of standing in a powerful way

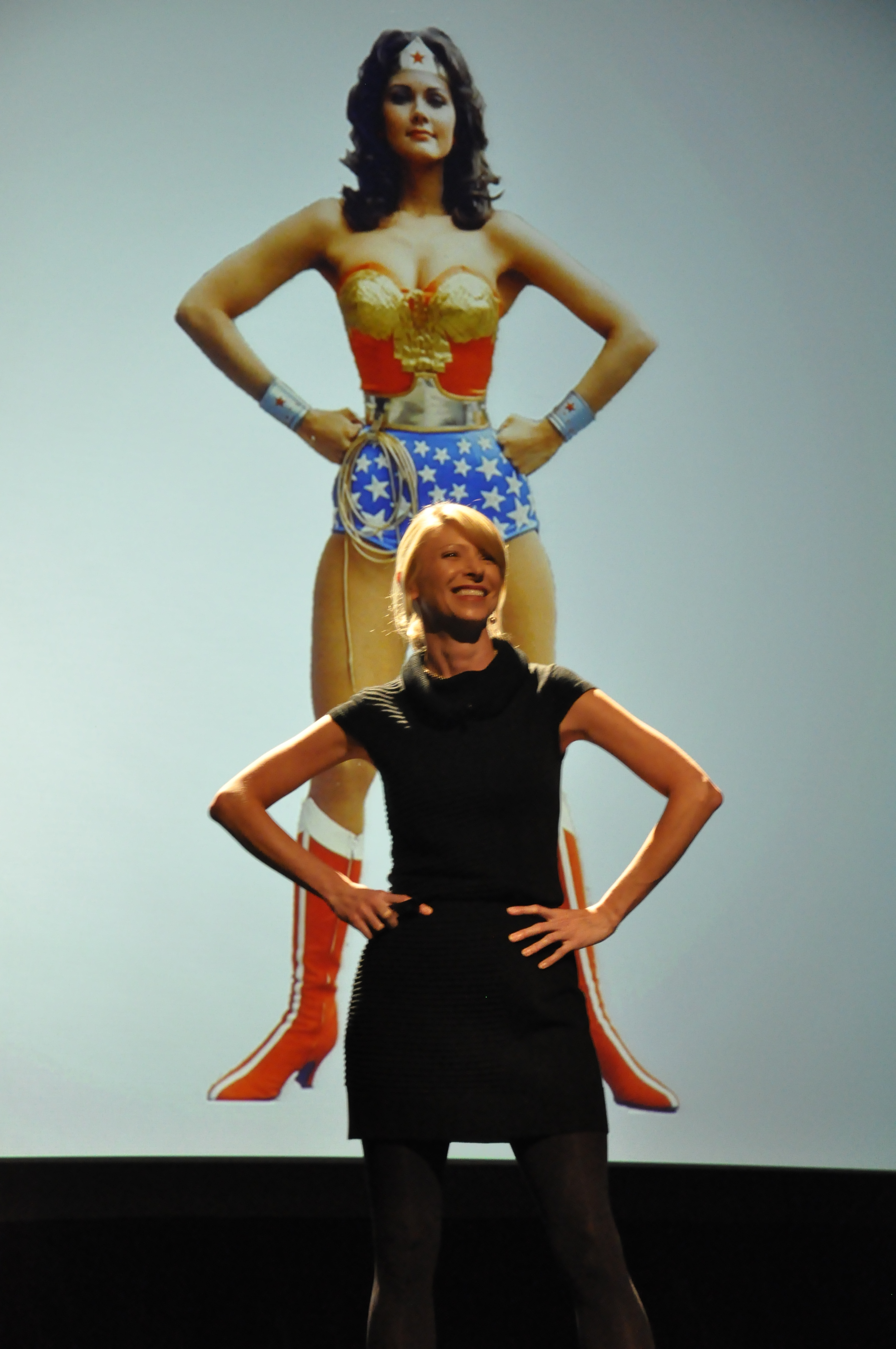
Amy Cuddy demonstrating her theory of "power posing" with a photo of the comic-book superhero Wonder Woman

Power posing is the practice of standing in a posture mentally associated with being powerful, in the hope of feeling more confident and behaving more assertively. Though the underlying science is disputed, its promoters argue that people can foster positive life changes simply by assuming a "powerful" or "expansive" posture for a few minutes before an interaction in which confidence is needed. One popular image of the technique in practice is that of candidates "[locking] themselves in bathroom stalls before job interviews to make victory V's with their arms."

Power posing was first suggested in a 2010 paper by Dana R. Carney, Amy Cuddy, and Andy Yap in the journal Psychological Science, and came to prominence through a popular TED talk by Cuddy in 2012. However, in 2015 several researchers began reporting that the effect could not be replicated, and, in 2016, Carney issued a statement abandoning the theory. Cuddy, however, continued her research, claiming to have evidence that posture feedback can at least make people feel more powerful. Today, power posing is often cited as an example of the replication crisis in the sciences.

== Initial claims ==
The initial research on power posing was published in 2010. Dana Carney, Amy Cuddy, and Andy Yap claimed that high-power poses "produce power". The study included 42 participants, who were coached by researchers to assume a physical position of power. Hormone levels were measured before and after, and the authors stated that they found an increase in testosterone and a decrease in cortisol after posing. The researchers themselves suggested a range of possible real-world applications:

These findings suggest that, in some situations requiring power, people have the ability to "fake it 'til they make it." Over time and in aggregate, these minimal postural changes and their outcomes potentially could improve a person's general health and well-being. This potential benefit is particularly important when considering people who are or who feel chronically powerless because of lack of resources, low hierarchical rank in an organization, or membership in a low-power social group."

The researchers concluded that power posing induces lasting hormonal changes, which can lead to better outcomes in work-related situations, such as job interviews and wage negotiations.

== Replication failures and meta-analyses ==
The earliest criticism of Carney, Cuddy and Yap's work came from Steven Stanton, who noted their lack of attention to gender differences. "Carney et al. used a novel manipulation to ask an important question," he concluded, "but the degree to which their findings can be fully understood and implemented into future research is questionable without more complete analyses."

A 2015 article, published in Psychological Science by Ranehill et al. reported the results of a conceptual replication of the study using a larger sample. The researchers confirmed Carney et al.'s results about felt power but could not detect any physiological or behavioral effects of power posing. The statistical methods that may have led to the original erroneous findings were reviewed by Uri Simonsohn and Joseph Simmons of the Wharton School in a 2016 paper, concluding that the current body of research fails to "suggest the existence of an effect once we account for selective reporting".

In the years that followed, attempts were made by various research groups to apply power posing manipulation in different contexts. The results did not support the assumptions made by Cuddy et al. In a 2016 study by Garrison et al. the effect of posture manipulation was combined with dominant vs. submissive gaze. However, no effect was found on risk taking and, in contrast to original expectations, adopting an expansive pose reduced feelings of power. Deuter et al. (2016) investigated the effect of cognitive role taking and Cuddy's power posing manipulation in the Trier Social Stress Test; although role taking had an influence on the cortisol and testosterone response after stress, the posture manipulation had no effect on hormonal, behavioral or subjective measures.

In a study conducted by Smith et al. in 2017, participants had to compete in a challenging task while they had to assume high or low power poses. The authors report no main effect of pose type on testosterone, cortisol, risk or feelings of power. However, they found an interaction between pose type and competition outcome on testosterone: while winners assigned to a high-power pose had small increases in testosterone levels, losers had a reduction in testosterone after holding high-power poses.

In 2016, Dana Carney, who had been the lead author on the original 2010 paper and had supported the publication of the 2015 Ranehill et al. replication attempt, published a statement on the University of California, Berkeley website, stating that she no longer believed the effect was valid: "I do not believe that 'power pose effects' are real...the evidence against the existence of power poses is undeniable."

Joseph Cesario, an associate professor of psychology at Michigan State University, who co-edits Comprehensive Results in Social Psychology, arranged a special issue on power posing that published in June 2017; the issue included eleven new studies, along with a meta-analyses, which found that the effect of power posing on power behaviors was not replicated. The published studies were designed to answer whether the power-posing hypothesis was real and included high quality research features like pre-registration of endpoints. Carney co-authored the introduction to the issue, and noted that while the meta-analysis failed to find any effect in power behaviors, it did find a medium-sized effect in a feeling of power; she also wrote that the studies could not resolve whether the effect on a feeling of power was only an experimental artifact.

In 2017, a meta-study by Cuddy et al. surveyed 55 studies about power poses, and found "strong evidential value for postural-feedback (i.e., power-posing) effects and particularly robust evidential value for effects on emotional and affective states (e.g., mood and evaluations, attitudes, and feelings about the self)"

A comprehensive meta-analytic review that analyzed 128 studies on the topic of body postures such as power posing, considering both published and unpublished papers, suggests that power posing has a reliable effect on thoughts and feelings (e.g., positive mood, self-esteem, feelings of dominance). However, power posing has no effect on physiological measures (e.g., hormone levels, blood pressure, skin conductance). Although the authors report an effect on behavioral measures, it remains unclear whether this effect actually exists or is due to selective reporting of significant results. In addition, the researchers point to limitations of the power posing literature: Few studies have included a control group (neutral posture), so it remains unclear whether the effect comes from dominant postures (so-called high power poses) or from submissive, slumped postures (so-called low power poses).

== Confounded tests of power posing ==
Several researchers have noted that many power posing studies lacked a proper control group. Many studies compared an expansive "power pose" only with a contractive pose, such as slouching, and failed to include a neutral, ordinary pose as a baseline.

This is an instance of a general design flaw called the "poison-medicine" problem. Suppose researchers want to know whether a medicine (m) promotes longevity (y), but they compare it only with a poison (p), with no neutral (placebo) condition. If the medicine group outlives the poison group, written y(m) > y(p), that gap could arise in more than one way besides the medicine prolonging life: (a) the medicine does nothing, and the poison shortens life, or (b) the medicine shortens life, but the poison shortens it even more. Only a neutral baseline can tell these explanations apart. Likewise, a difference between people in expansive poses and people in slouched poses does not show that expansive poses help, because slouching alone could account for the gap.

This error is often overlooked when testing psychological theories. For example, in Galinsky-type power priming studies, a high-power prime is typically compared with a low-power prime, with no neutral condition. Adding a baseline does not fully fix the problem for priming of this sort, because it creates an asymmetric demand effect: participants may pick up on what the researchers expect, and the pressure to act on that expectation is not equal in both directions. This precludes correct causal inference.

== Public attention ==
Since its promotion in a 2010 Harvard Business School Working Knowledge post, Amy Cuddy has been the most visible proponent of power posing in the public sphere. Her interest in "studying how people can become their aspirational selves" stems from her own experience of recovering from head trauma after a car accident. The power posing "hack" gained wide attention after a TED talk she gave in 2012, where she demonstrated the posture and argued for its benefits. The technique was then covered by CNN and Oprah Winfrey; it was the centerpiece of her 2015 book Presence: Bringing your boldest self to your biggest challenges; and by 2017 her TED talk had been viewed by about 47 million viewers, becoming the second most popular.

In 2015, several news outlets in the United Kingdom said that some members of the UK Conservative Party had begun to adopt a "bizarre" wide stance at high-profile political events, which some suggested was based on Cuddy's 'power posing' advice. While this was referred to by some as the "Tory power pose", it had previously been used by Labour Prime Minister Tony Blair. Politicians publicly photographed in this stance include Sajid Javid, George Osborne, David Cameron, Tony Blair, and Theresa May.

By 2016, public discussion of power posing had shifted to the difficulty of replicating the effect in subsequent studies. An extensive series of articles on power posing replication was published by New York magazine by Jesse Singal and other contributors in its Science of Us section. There was intense controversy around these issues and Cuddy reported experiencing harassment, including death threats, after the findings were not replicated. In the spring of 2017, Cuddy left Harvard but continues to promote power posing as life-improvement technique.

== See also ==
- Facial feedback hypothesis
- Fake it till you make it
- Pathological science
- P-hacking
