= Faking It =

Faking It or Fakin' It may refer to:

== Literature ==
- Faking It: The Quest for Authenticity in Popular Music, a 2007 book by Yuval Taylor and Hugh Barker
- Faking It, a 2002 novel by Jennifer Crusie
- Faking It, a 2023 novel by Beth Reekles

== Music ==
- "Faking It" (song), by Calvin Harris, 2017
- "Fakin' It" (K. Michelle song), 2009
- "Fakin' It" (Simon & Garfunkel song), 1967

== Television ==
- Faking It (American TV series), a 2014–2016 teen romantic comedy series
- Faking It (British TV series), a 2000–2006 reality series
- Faking It USA, a 2003–2005 reality series
- "Fakin' It" (Arrested Development), a 2006 episode
- "Faking It" (Doctors), a 2003 episode
- "Faking It" (NCIS), a 2006 episode

== See also ==
- "Fake it till you make it", an aspirational aphorism
