= Susan Fiske =

American psychologist

- Born: August 19, 1952 (age 74)
- Education: Radcliffe College (BA); Harvard University (PhD)
- Occupations: Professor of psychology at Princeton University, author
- Known for: Stereotype content model, ambivalent sexism theory, cognitive miser
- Relatives: Donald Fiske (father), Alan Fiske (brother)

Susan Tufts Fiske (born August 19, 1952) is an American psychologist who served as the Eugene Higgins Professor of Psychology and Public Affairs in the Department of Psychology at Princeton University until her retirement in 2023. She is a social psychologist known for her work on social cognition, stereotypes, and prejudice. At Princeton, Fiske led the Intergroup Relations, Social Cognition, and Social Neuroscience Lab. Her theoretical contributions include the development of the stereotype content model, ambivalent sexism theory, power as control theory, and the continuum model of impression formation.

== Biography ==
Fiske comes from a family of psychologists and social activists. Her father, Donald W. Fiske, was an influential psychologist who spent most of his career at the University of Chicago. Her mother, Barbara Page Fiske (1917–2007), was a civic leader in Chicago. Her brother, Alan Page Fiske, is an anthropologist at UCLA. Fiske's grandmother and great grandmother were suffragists. Two nieces and her daughter all have psychology PhDs. In 1969, Susan Fiske enrolled at Radcliffe College for her undergraduate degree in social relations, where she graduated magna cum laude in 1973. She received her PhD from Harvard University in 1978, for her thesis titled Attention and the Weighting of Behavior in Person Perception. She currently resides in Vermont, with her husband Douglas Massey, a retired Princeton sociologist.

== Career ==
The last semester of Fiske's senior year, she worked with Shelley Taylor, an assistant professor at Harvard, studying social cognition, particularly the effect attention has in social situations. After graduation, Fiske continued in the field of social cognition. There is conflict between the fields of social psychology and cognitive psychology, and some researchers want to keep these two fields separate. Fiske felt that significant knowledge could be attained by combining the fields. Fiske's experience with this conflict and her interest in the field of social cognition resulted in Fiske's and Taylor's book Social Cognition. This book provides an overview of the developing theories and concepts emerging in the field of social cognition, while explaining the use cognitive processes to understand social situations, ourselves and others. Fiske and Steven Neuberg went on to develop one of the first dual process models of social cognition, the "continuum model."

She gave expert testimony in the landmark case, Price Waterhouse v. Hopkins which was eventually heard by the Supreme Court of the United States, making her the first social psychologist to testify in a gender discrimination case. This testimony led to a continuing interest in the use of psychological science in legal contexts.

Working with Peter Glick, Fiske analyzed the interdependence of male-female interactions, leading to the development of ambivalent sexism theory. She also examined gender differences in social psychologists' publication rates and citations within the influential psychology journal, Journal of Personality and Social Psychology. The male authors in the sample submitted more articles and had higher acceptance rates (18% vs. 14%). Women's impact was the same as men's as measured through the number of citations in textbooks and handbooks, so women were more cited per article published.

Fiske worked with Peter Glick and Amy Cuddy to develop the Stereotype Content Model. This model explains that warmth and competence differentiate out group stereotypes.

Fiske has been involved in the field of social cognitive neuroscience. This field examines how neural systems are involved in social processes, such as person perception. Fiske's own work has examined neural systems involved in stereotyping, intergroup hostility, and impression formation.

She has authored over 400 publications and has written several books, including her 2010 work Social Beings: A Core Motives Approach to Social Psychology and Social Cognition, a graduate level text that defined the now-popular subfield of social cognition. She has edited the Annual Review of Psychology (with Daniel Schacter and Shelley Taylor) and the Handbook of Social Psychology (with Daniel Gilbert and the late Gardner Lindzey). Other books include Envy Up, Scorn Down: How Status Divides Us, which describes how people constantly compare themselves to others, with toxic effects on their relationships at home, at work, in school, and in the world, and The Human Brand: How We Relate to People, Products, and Companies. She serves on the Board of Directors of Annual Reviews.

== Research ==
Her four most well-known contributions to the field of psychology are the stereotype content model, ambivalent sexism theory, the continuum model of impression formation, and the power-as-control theory. She is also known for the term cognitive miser, coined with her graduate adviser Shelley E. Taylor under the late Amos Tversky, referring to individuals' tendencies to use cognitive shortcuts and heuristics.

=== Stereotype content model ===
The stereotype content model (SCM) is a psychological theory arguing that people tend to perceive social groups along two fundamental dimensions: warmth and competence. Warmth describes the group's perceived intent (friendly and trustworthy or not); competence describes their perceived ability to act on their intent. The SCM was originally developed to understand the social classification of groups within the population of the U.S. However, the SCM has since been applied to analyzing social classes and structures across countries and history.

Most samples view their own middle class as both warm and competent, but they view refugees, homeless people, and undocumented immigrants as neither warm nor competent. The SCM's innovation is identifying mixed stereotypes—high on competence but low on warmth (e.g., rich people) or high on warmth but low on competence (e.g., elderly people). Nations with higher income inequality tend to use these mixed stereotypes more frequently.

Groups' perceived cooperativeness predicts their perceived warmth, and this dimension reflects the importance of intent. Warmth predicts active helping and harming. A group's perceived status predicts its stereotypic competence, so this reflects a belief in meritocracy, that people get what they deserve. Competence predicts passive helping and harming.

=== Ambivalent sexism theory ===
Fiske and Peter Glick developed the ambivalent sexism inventory (ASI) as a way of understanding prejudice against women. The ASI posits two sub-components of gender stereotyping: hostile sexism (hostility towards nontraditional women), and benevolent sexism (idealizing and protecting traditional women). The theory posits that men and women's intimate interdependence, coupled with men's average status advantage, requires incentives for women who cooperate (benevolent sexism) and punishment for women who resist (hostile sexism). Both men and women can endorse hostile sexism and benevolent sexism, though men on average score higher than women, especially on hostile sexism. Though HS and BS entail opposite attitudinal dispositions toward women, they are positively correlated. The ASI appears useful across nations. The authors have also developed a parallel scale of ambivalence toward men. According to a recent review, the ASI scale has been used by 654 peer-reviewed studies with adult populations.

=== Power-as-control theory ===
Power-as-control theory aims to explain how social power motivates people to heed or ignore others. In this framework, power is defined as control over valued resources and over others' outcomes. Low-power individuals watch those who control resources, while powerful people do not need to watch low-power individuals (since high-power individuals can, by definition, get what they want).

=== Continuum model of impression formation ===
This model describes the process by which we form impressions of others. Impression formation is framed as depending on two factors: The available information and the perceiver's motivations. According to the model, these two factors help to explain people's tendency to apply stereotyping processes vs. individuating processes when forming social impressions.

== Response to 'replication crisis' ==
With the replication crisis of psychology earning attention, Fiske drew controversy for calling out critics of psychology. In a letter intended for publication in APS Observer, she referred to these unnamed "adversaries" as "methodological terrorist" and "self-appointed data police", and said that criticism of psychology should only be expressed in private or through contacting the journals. Columbia University statistician and political scientist Andrew Gelman, "well-respected among the researchers driving the replication debate", responded to Fiske, saying that she had found herself willing to tolerate the "dead paradigm" of faulty statistics and had refused to retract publications even when errors were pointed out. He added that during her tenure as editor a number of papers edited by her were found to be based on extremely weak statistics; one of Fiske's own published papers had a major statistical error and "impossible" conclusions.

After the leak of her letter, she tempered the language in the published APS Observer column, removing the term "methodological terrorists". In the column, she expressed concern that although peer critiques are valuable, peer critique through social media outlets "can encourage a certain amount of uncurated, unfiltered denigration." She elaborated: "In a few rare but chilling cases, self-appointed data police are volunteering critiques" that "attack the person, not just the work; they attack publicly, without quality controls; they have reportedly sent their unsolicited, unvetted attacks to tenure-review committees and public-speaking sponsors; they have implicated targets' family members and advisors." Since writing the column, Fiske has published peer-reviewed advice about publishing rigorous research in the 21st century and about adversarial collaboration as a remedy to public incivility among disagreeing perspectives.

== Awards and achievements ==
Fiske became an elected member of the National Academy of Sciences in 2013. In 2011, Fiske was elected into the Fellowship of the British Academy. In 2010, she was awarded the American Psychological Association Distinguished Scientific Contribution Award. She received numerous awards in 2009, including a Guggenheim Fellowship, the Association for Psychological Science William James Fellow Award, and the Society for Personality and Social Psychology Donald Campbell Award. In 2008, Fiske received the Staats Award for Unifying Psychology, from the American Psychological Association. In 2003, she was awarded the Thomas Ostrom Award from the International Social Cognition Network and for 2019 the BBVA Foundation Frontiers of Knowledge Award in Social Sciences.

Fiske was awarded honorary degrees from the University of Granada in 2017, University of Basel in 2013, the University of Leiden in 2009 and the Université catholique de Louvain in 1995.

She served as past president of the Society for Personality and Social Psychology, Division 8 of the American Psychological Association, the Federation of Associations in Behavioral and Brain Sciences, the Foundation for the Advancement of Behavioral and Brain Sciences, and the American Psychological Society (now the Association for Psychological Science). She is also a fellow of the American Academy of Arts and Sciences and the American Academy of Political and Social Science. She was elected to the American Philosophical Society in 2014.

A quantitative analysis published in 2014 identified Fiske as the 22nd most eminent researcher in the modern era of psychology (12th among living researchers, 2nd among women).

=== Books ===
- Fiske, Susan T. (2011). Envy up, scorn down: How status divides us. New York: Russell Sage Foundation. ISBN 978-0-87154-464-3.
- Todorov, Alexander T.; Fiske, Susan T.; Prentice, Deborah (2011). Social neuroscience: Toward understanding the underpinnings of the social mind. New York: Oxford University Press. ISBN 978-0-19-531687-2.
- Fiske, Susan T.; Markus, Hazel R. (2012). Facing social class: How societal rank influences interaction. London: Russell Sage Foundation. ISBN 978-0-87154-479-7.
- Fiske, Susan T.; Taylor, Shelley E. (2013). Social cognition: From brains to culture (2nd ed.). London: Sage. ISBN 978-1-4462-5815-6.
- Fiske, Susan T. (2014). Social beings (4th ed.). New York: Wiley.
- Editor of the 2004, 2008, 2009, 2010, 2011, and 2012 editions of Annual Review of Psychology
- Editor of the 2010 edition of Handbook of Social Psychology
- Editor of the 2012 edition of the Sage Handbook of Social Cognition
- Editor of Sage Major Works in Social Cognition (2013)
- Sternberg, R. J., Fiske, S. T., & Foss, D. J. (Eds.). (2016). Scientists making a difference. Cambridge University Press.

=== Selected journal articles ===
- Fiske, Susan T.; Taylor, S. E. (1978). Salience, attention, and attribution: Top-of-the-head phenomena. Advances in Experimental Social Psychology. Vol. 11. pp. 249–288. doi:10.1016/s0065-2601(08)60009-x. ISBN 978-0-12-015211-7.
- Fiske, Susan T.; Taylor, S. E.; Etcoff, N. L.; Ruderman, A. J. (1978). "Categorical and contextual bases of person memory and stereotyping". Journal of Personality and Social Psychology. 36 (7): 778–793. doi:10.1037/0022-3514.36.7.778.
- Fiske, Susan T. (1980). "Attention and weight in person perception: The impact of negative and extreme behavior". Journal of Personality and Social Psychology. 38 (6): 889–906. doi:10.1037/0022-3514.38.6.889.
- Fiske, Susan T.; Abelson, R.P.; Kinder, D.R.; Peters, M.D. (1982). "Affective and semantic components in political person perception". Journal of Personality and Social Psychology. 42 (4): 619–630. doi:10.1037/0022-3514.42.4.619.
- Fiske, Susan T.; Neuberg, S. L. (1990). A continuum of impression formation, from category-based to individuating processes: Influences of information and motivation on attention and interpretation. Advances in Experimental Social Psychology. Vol. 23. pp. 1–74. doi:10.1016/s0065-2601(08)60317-2. ISBN 978-0-12-015223-0.
- Fiske, Susan T. (1993). "Controlling other people: The impact of power on stereotyping". American Psychologist. 48 (6): 621–628. doi:10.1037/0003-066x.48.6.621. PMID 8328729.
- Fiske, Susan T. (February 1993). "Social cognition and social perceptions". Annual Review of Psychology. 44 (1): 155–194. doi:10.1146/annurev.ps.44.020193.001103. PMID 8434891.
- Fiske, Susan T.; Glick, P. (1996). "The Ambivalent Sexism Inventory: Differentiating hostile and benevolent sexism". Journal of Personality and Social Psychology. 70 (3): 491–512. CiteSeerX 10.1.1.470.9865. doi:10.1037/0022-3514.70.3.491.
- Fiske, Susan T. (1998). "Stereotyping, prejudice, and discrimination". Handbook of Social Psychology. 2 (1) (4 ed.): 357–411.
- Fiske, Susan T.; Glick, P. (2001). "An ambivalent alliance: Hostile and benevolent sexism as complementary justifications of gender inequality". American Psychologist. 56 (2): 109–118. doi:10.1037/0003-066x.56.2.109. PMID 11279804.
- Fiske, Susan T.; Cuddy, Amy J.C.; Glick, Peter; Xu, Jun (June 2002). "A model of (often mixed) stereotype content: competence and warmth respectively follow from perceived status and competition". Journal of Personality and Social Psychology. 82 (6): 878–902. CiteSeerX 10.1.1.320.4001. doi:10.1037/0022-3514.82.6.878. PMID 12051578. S2CID 17057403.
- Fiske, Susan T.; Borgida, Eugene (August 2008). "Providing expert knowledge in an adversarial context: social cognitive science in employment discrimination cases". Annual Review of Law and Social Science. 4 (1): 123–148. doi:10.1146/annurev.lawsocsci.4.110707.172350.
- Cikara, Mina; Eberhardt, Jennifer L.; Fiske, Susan T. (December 2010). "From agents to objects: sexist attitudes and neural responses to sexualized targets". Journal of Cognitive Neuroscience. 23 (3): 540–551. doi:10.1162/jocn.2010.21497. PMC 3801174. PMID 20350187.
