= Peter Glick (psychologist) =

American social psychologist

- Born: Peter Samuel Glick
- Education: Oberlin College; University of Minnesota
- Scientific career
- Fields: Social psychology
- Institutions: Lawrence University
- Thesis: Orientations toward relationships: Choosing a situation in which to begin a relationship (1984)

Peter Samuel Glick is an American social psychologist and the Henry Merritt Wriston Professor in the Social Sciences at Lawrence University. He is known for his research on gender stereotyping and ambivalent sexism. In 2022, Glick, Amy Cuddy, and Susan Fiske were honored with the Society of Experimental Social Psychology's Scientific Impact Award for their 2002 paper proposing the stereotype content model.
