= Facial feedback hypothesis =

Hypothesis that expression influences emotions

The facial feedback hypothesis, rooted in the conjectures of Charles Darwin and William James, is that one's facial expression directly affects their emotional experience. Specifically, physiological activation of the facial regions associated with certain emotions holds a direct effect on the elicitation of such emotional states, and the lack of or inhibition of facial activation will result in the suppression (or absence altogether) of corresponding emotional states.

Variations of the facial feedback hypothesis differ in regards to what extent engaging in a given facial expression plays in the modulation of affective experience. Particularly, a "strong" version (facial feedback is the decisive factor in whether emotional perception occurs or not) and a "weak" version (facial expression plays a limited role in influencing affect). While a plethora of research exists on the facial feedback hypothesis and its variations, only the weak version has received substantial support, thus it is widely suggested that facial expression likely holds a minor facilitative impact on emotional experience. However, a 2019 meta-analysis, which generally confirmed small but significant effects found larger effect sizes in the absence of emotional stimuli, suggesting that facial feedback has a stronger initiating effect rather than a modulating one (with an effect size of d=.2 overall, .32 without stimuli, and .13 with).

Further evidence showed that facial feedback is not essential to the onset of affective states. This is reflected in studies investigating emotional experience in facial paralysis patients when compared to participants without the condition. Results of these studies commonly found that emotional experiences did not significantly differ in the unavoidable absence of facial expression within facial paralysis patients.

== Background ==
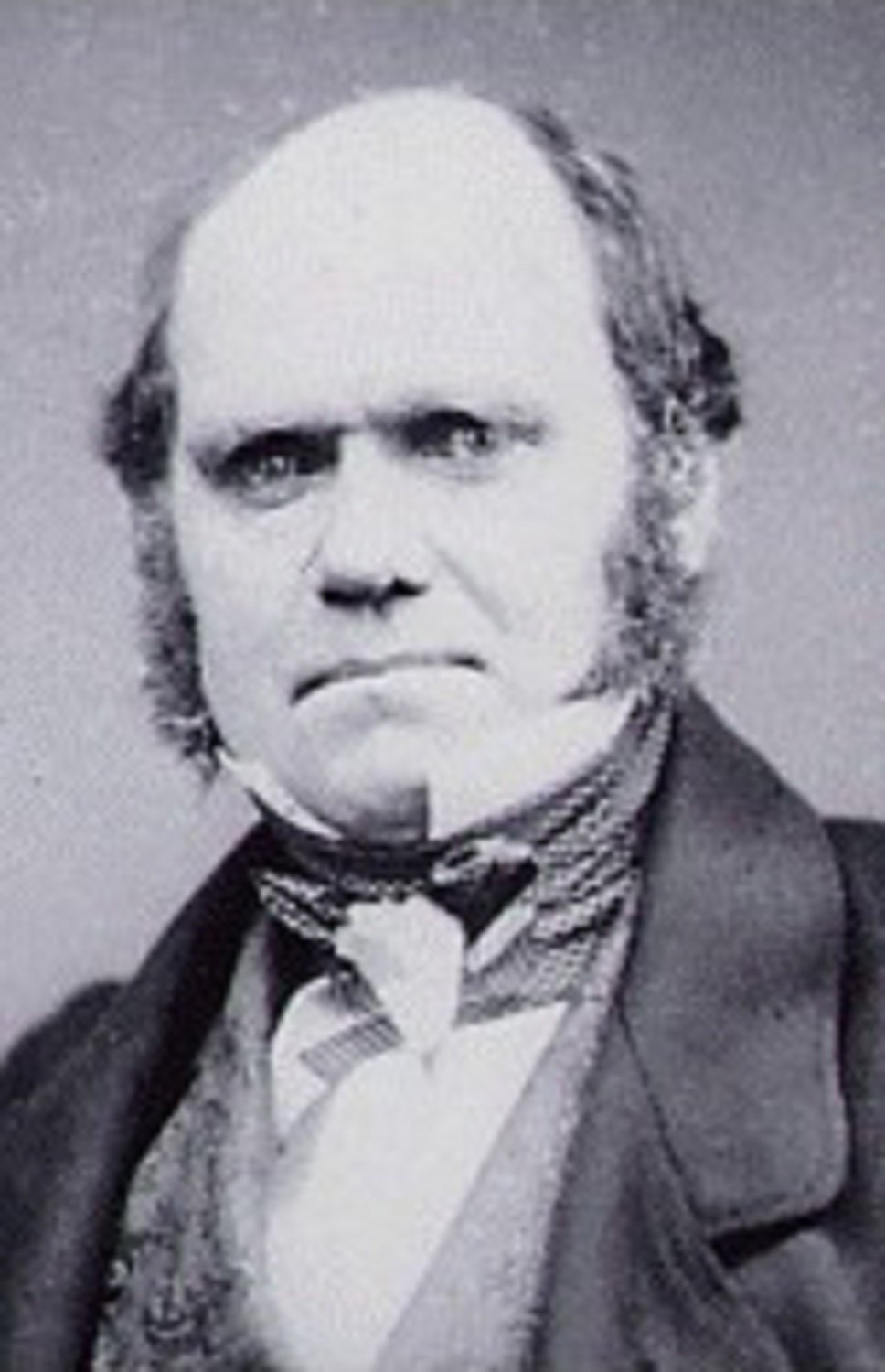
Charles Darwin

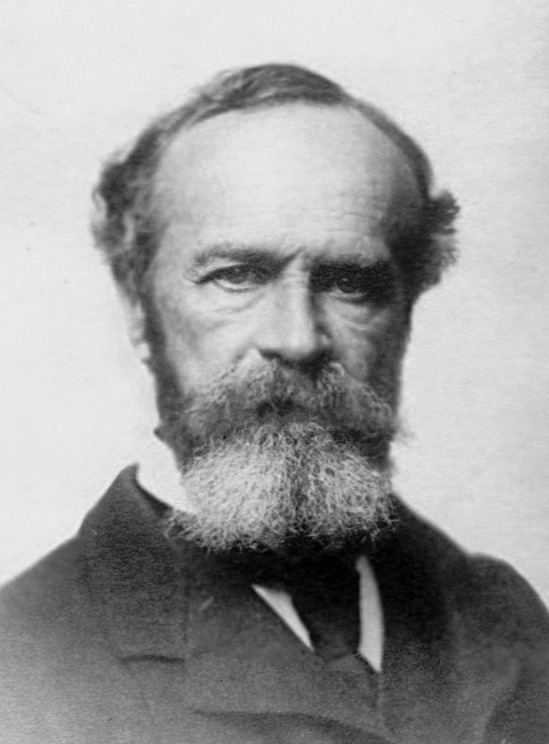
William James

Charles Darwin was among the first to suggest that physiological changes caused by an emotion had a direct impact on, rather than being just the consequence of that emotion. He wrote:

The free expression by outward signs of an emotion intensifies it. On the other hand, the repression, as far as this is possible, of all outward signs softens our emotions... Even the simulation of an emotion tends to arouse it in our minds.

Succeeding this postulation, William James (who was also a principal contributor to the related James-Lange theory) proposed that instead of the common belief an emotional state results in muscular expression, proprioception activated by a stimulus "is the emotion" and should one "refuse to express a passion...it dies". In other words, in the absence of awareness of bodily movement, there is only intellectual thought, with consequently the mind being devoid of emotional warmth.

During this period, the posits culminating in the facial feedback hypothesis lacked evidence, apart from limited research in animal behavior and studies of people with severely impaired emotional functioning. Formalized research on Darwin's and James' proposals were not commonly conducted until the latter half of the 1970s and the 1980s; almost a century after Darwin's first proposal on the topic. Furthermore, the term "facial feedback hypothesis" was not popularized in research until around 1980, with one early definition of the hypothesis being "skeletal muscle feedback from facial expressions plays a causal role in regulating emotional experience and behaviour."

== Development of the theory ==
While James included the influence of all bodily changes on the creation of an emotion, "including among them visceral, muscular, and cutaneous effects", modern research mainly focuses on the effects of facial muscular activity. One of the first to do so, Silvan Tomkins wrote in 1962 that "the face expresses affect, both to others and the self, via feedback, which is more rapid and more complex than any stimulation of which the slower moving visceral organs are capable".

Two versions of the facial feedback hypothesis came to be commonly referenced, albeit sometimes being unclear in distinction.

- The weak version, rooted in Darwin's writings, proposes that facial expression modulates emotional states in a minor and limited manner. Thomas McCanne and Judith Anderson (1987) instructed participants imagine pleasant or unpleasant imagery while they increased or suppressed activity with certain facial muscle regions responsible for the actions of smiling or frowning: respectively the zygomatic and corrugator muscle regions. A subsequent change in participants' emotional response was implied to have occurred as a result of intentional manipulation of the aforementioned facial muscle regions.
- The strong variation—coinciding with James' postulations—implies that facial feedback is independently and chiefly responsible for the onset and perception of an emotional state.

Since the writings of Darwin and James, extensive research on the facial feedback hypothesis has been conducted, with multiple studies being largely formative to how the facial feedback hypothesis is defined, tested, and accepted, with some of the most notable studies conducted in the 1970s and 1980s—a period of time that was critical to the contemporary development of the facial feedback hypothesis. For example, arguably one of the most—if not the most—influential studies on the facial feedback hypothesis was conducted by Fritz Strack, Leonard L. Martin, and Sabine Stepper in 1988. These authors pioneered a technique in which researchers were able to measure the effect of the actions of smiling and frowning on affect through inducing such expressions in an undetectable manner to the participant, offering a supposed level of control not yet before utilized in similar studies. This was achieved by asking each participant to hold a pen in between their teeth (inducing a smile) or between their lips (inducing a frown) while instructed to view comedic cartoons. The study concluded that participants who engaged in a smiling expression (pen between teeth) reported a higher humor response to the cartoons as opposed to when participants held a frowning expression (pen between lips). This study proved to be highly influential in not only widespread acceptance of the facial feedback hypothesis (e.g., being commonly cited in introductory psychology classes), but also influenced numerous other ensuing studies to utilize elements from the 1988 procedure.

In 2016, a large-scale Registered Replication Report was conducted with the purpose of meticulously replicating Strack, Martin, and Stepper's study and testing the facial feedback hypothesis across 17 different labs across varying countries and cultures. However, this study failed to reproduce the 1988 study's results, consequently failing to support the facial feedback hypothesis and shedding doubt upon the validity of Strack, Martin, and Stepper's study.

Furthermore, Lanzetta et al. (1976) conducted an influential study in support of the facial feedback hypothesis finding that participants who inhibited the display of pain-related expression had lower skin conductance response (a measure commonly used to measure the activation of the sympathetic nervous system, or stress response) and subjective ratings of pain, compared with participants who openly expressed intense pain.

However, in general, research of the facial feedback hypothesis is characterized by difficulty in determining how to measure the effect of facial expressions on affect without alerting the participant to the nature of the study and also ensure that the connection between facial activity and corresponding emotion is not implicit in the procedure.

== Methodological issues ==
Originally, the facial feedback hypothesis studied the enhancing or suppressing effect of facial efference on emotion in the context of spontaneous, "real" emotions, using stimuli. This resulted in "the inability of research using spontaneous efference to separate correlation from causality". Laird (1974) used a cover story (measuring muscular facial activity with electrodes) to induce particular facial muscles contraction in his participants without mentioning any emotional state. However, the higher funniness ratings of the cartoons obtained by those participants "tricked" into smiling may have been caused by their recognizing the muscular contraction and its corresponding emotion: the "self-perception mechanism", which Laird (1974) thought was at the root of the facial feedback phenomenon. Perceiving physiological changes, people "fill the blank" by feeling the corresponding emotion. In the original studies, Laird had to exclude 16% (Study 1) and 19% (Study 2) of the participants as they had become aware of the physical and emotional connection during the study.

Another difficulty is whether the process of manipulation of the facial muscles did not cause so much exertion and fatigue that those, partially or wholly, caused the physiological changes and subsequently the emotion. Finally, the presence of physiological change may have been induced or modified by cognitive process.

== Experimental confirmation ==
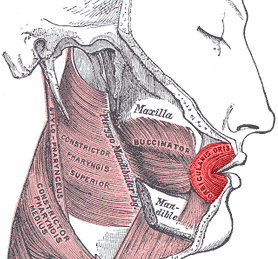
Orbicularis oris muscle

In an attempt to provide a clear assessment of the theory that a purely physical facial change, involving only certain facial muscles, can result in an emotion, Strack, Martin, & Stepper (1988) devised a cover story that would ensure the participants adopt the desired facial posing without being able to perceive either the corresponding emotion or the researchers' real motive. Told they were taking part in a study to determine the difficulty for people without the use of their hands or arms to accomplish certain tasks, participants held a pen in their mouth in one of two ways. The Lip position would contract the orbicularis oris muscle, resulting in a frown. The Teeth position would cause the zygomaticus major or the risorius muscle, resulting in a smile. The control group would hold the pen in their nondominant hand. All had to fill a questionnaire in that position and rate the difficulty involved. The last task, which was the real objective of the test, was the subjective rating of the funniness of a cartoon. The test differed from previous methods in that there were no emotional states to emulate, dissimulate or exaggerate.

As predicted, participants in the Teeth condition reported significantly higher amusement ratings than those in the Lips condition. The cover story and the procedure were found to be very successful at initiating the required contraction of the muscles without arising suspicion, 'cognitive interpretation of the facial action, and avoiding significant demand and order effects. It has been suggested that more effort may be involved in holding a pen with the lips compared with the teeth.

To avoid the possible effort problem, Zajonc, Murphy and Inglehart (1989) had subjects repeat different vowels, provoking smiles with "ah" sounds and frowns with "ooh" sounds for example, and again found a measurable effect of facial feedback. Ritual chanting of smile vowels has been found to be more pleasant than chanting of frown vowels, which may explain their comparative prevalence in religious mantra traditions.

However, doubts about the robustness of these findings was voiced in 2016 when a replication series of the original 1988 experiment coordinated by Eric-Jan Wagenmakers and conducted in 17 labs did not find systematic effects of facial feedback. In a subsequent analysis, Noah et al. identified a significant methodological discrepancy (camera directed on participants) and replicated the original results under the no-camera condition. More recently, Ras et al. (2026) demonstrated that pen-induced facial feedback affected the evaluation of happy faces in the predicted direction. Moreover, the authors' results support Darwin's "weak" version of the theory in that facial feedback must be elicited by a consistent emotional stimulus.

Together, a number of methodological issues associated with the facial feedback hypothesis seem to be resolved in favor of Darwin's hypothesis. The moderate, yet significant effect of facial feedback on emotions opens the door to new research on the "multiple and nonmutually exclusive plausible mechanisms" of the effects of bodily activity on emotions. A 2019 meta-analysis of 138 studies confirmed small (with d=.2 overall, .32 in the absence of emotional stimuli, and .13 in the presence of emotional stimuli) but robust effects, along with a lack of publication bias. There was no statistically significant difference in the effect sizes of studies where participants were unaware of the purpose compared to those where they were. Furthermore, the study obseved a statistically non-significant effect where a larger proportion of women had large effect sizes compared to men.

== Studies using botulinum toxin (botox) ==
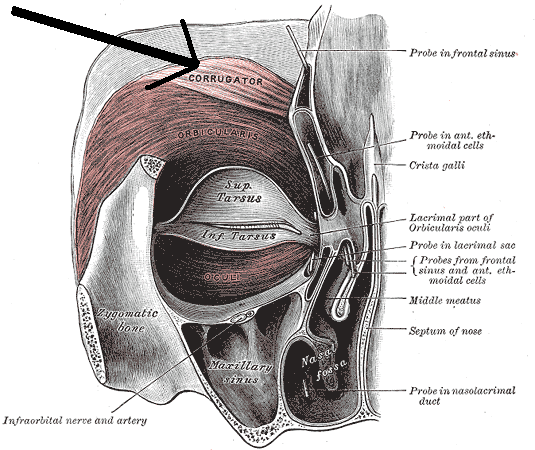
Corrugator supercilii muscle

Because facial expressions involve both motor (efferent) and sensory (afferent) mechanisms, it is possible that effects attributed to facial feedback are due solely to feedback mechanisms, or feed-forward mechanisms, or some combination of both. Recently, strong experimental support for a facial feedback mechanism is provided through the use of botulinum toxin (commonly known as Botox) to temporarily paralyze facial muscles. Botox selectively blocks muscle feedback by blocking presynaptic acetylcholine receptors at the neuromuscular junction. Thus, while motor efference commands to the facial muscles remain intact, sensory afference from extrafusal muscle fibers, and possibly intrafusal muscle fibers, is diminished.

Several studies have examined the correlation of botox injections and emotion and these suggest that the toxin could be used as a treatment for depression. Further studies have used experimental control to test the hypothesis that botox affects aspects of emotional processing. It has been suggested that the treatment of nasal muscles would reduce the ability of the person to form a disgust response which could offer a reduction of symptoms associated with obsessive compulsive disorder.

In a functional neuroimaging study, Andreas Hennenlotter and colleagues asked participants to perform a facial expression imitation task in an fMRI scanner before and two weeks after receiving botox injections in the corrugator supercilii muscle used in frowning. During imitation of angry facial expressions, botox decreased activation of brain regions implicated in emotional processing and emotional experience (namely, the amygdala and the brainstem), relative to activations before botox injection. These findings show that facial feedback modulates neural processing of emotional content, and that botox changes how the human brain responds to emotional situations.

In a study of cognitive processing of emotional content, David Havas and colleagues asked participants to read emotional (angry, sad, happy) sentences before and two weeks after botox injections in the corrugator supercilii muscle used in frowning. Reading times for angry and sad sentences were longer after botox injection than before injection, while reading times for happy sentences were unchanged. This finding shows that facial muscle paralysis has a selective effect on processing of emotional content. It also demonstrates that cosmetic use of botox affects aspects of human cognition – namely, the understanding of language.

== Autism spectrum disorders ==
A study by Mariëlle Stel, Claudia van den Heuvel, and Raymond C. Smeets has shown that the facial feedback hypothesis does not hold for people with autism spectrum disorders (ASD); that is, "individuals with ASD do not experience feedback from activated facial expressions as controls do".

== See also ==
- Embodied cognition
- Facial Action Coding System
- Fake it till you make it
- James–Lange theory
- Power posing
- Theories of emotion
- Two-factor theory of emotion

== Bibliography ==
- Andréasson, P.; Dimberg, U. (2008). "Emotional empathy and facial feedback". Journal of Nonverbal Behavior. 32 (4): 215–224. doi:10.1007/s10919-008-0052-z. S2CID 145616450.
