= Stereotype content model =

Model of group stereotypes and interpersonal impressions

In social psychology, the stereotype content model (SCM) is a model, first proposed in 2002, postulating that all group stereotypes and interpersonal impressions form along two dimensions: (1) warmth and (2) competence.

The model is based on the notion that people are evolutionarily predisposed to first assess a stranger's intent to either harm or help them (warmth dimension) and second to judge the stranger's capacity to act on that perceived intention (competence dimension). Social groups and individuals that compete for resources (e.g., college admissions space, fresh well water, etc.) with the in-group or self are treated with hostility or disdain. These groups and individuals fall along the low end of the warmth spectrum, while social groups and individuals with high social status (e.g., economically or educationally successful) are considered competent, and are found at the high end of the competence dimension's spectrum. Thus, lack of perceived threat predicts warmth evaluation and salient status symbols predict impressions of competence. The model was first proposed by social psychologist Susan Fiske and her colleagues Amy Cuddy, Peter Glick and Jun Xu. Subsequent experimental tests on a variety of national and international samples found the SCM to reliably predict stereotype content in different cultural contexts and affective reactions toward a variety of different groups. The model has also received support in such domains as interpersonal perception.

== Dimensions ==
=== Warmth ===
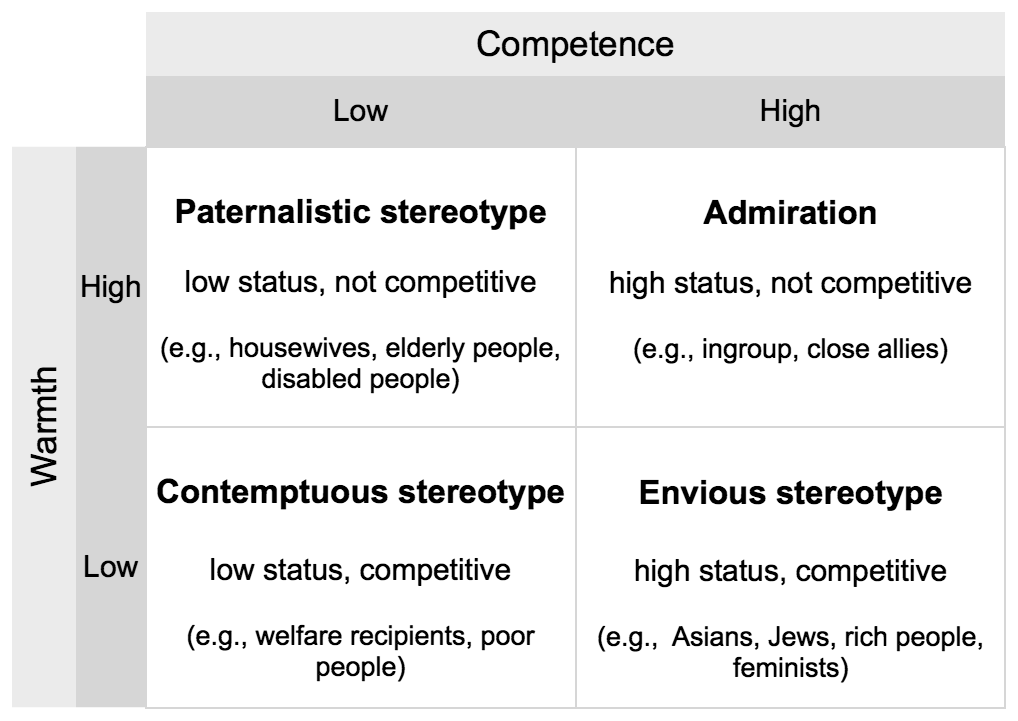
Stereotype content model, adapted from Fiske et al. (2002): Four types of stereotypes resulting from combinations of perceived warmth and competence.

Appraisals of warmth have a greater impact on interpersonal and intergroup relations than appraisals of competence. Warmth is, therefore, the primary dimension within the SCM. Assessments of an out-group or individual's potential threat level predicts the group or person's place along the warmth dimension's high/low spectrum. From an evolutionary perspective, warmth is primary because having a keen understanding of a person's competency is not as relevant if you already know that they are not trying to harm you. Early versions of the SCM predicted that intergroup or interpersonal competition drove ratings of warmth (low competition → high warmth; high competition → low warmth). In 2015, Kervyn, Fiske, and Yzerbyt expanded the SCM's original definition of threat also include to symbolic threats, based on Kinder and Sears (1981)'s symbolic racism theory, which stems from in-group fears over perceived threats to culture or value norms. In the same paper, Kervyn, Fiske, and Yzerbyt also broadened their concept of warmth and defined it as an umbrella term that encompasses both sociability and morality. This reconceptualization of warmth responded to earlier work by Leach, Ellemers, and Barreto (2007) who argued that the warmth dimension conflated two variables (1) sociability, which describes attributes such as cooperation and kindness, and (2) morality, describing an internal ethical sense. They proposed an alternative three-dimension model, which retained competence and divides warmth into morality and sociability. Their plea for the importance of morality in intergroup perception was also echoed by Brambilla et al. (2011) and Brambilla et al. (2012). In addition to broadening the definition of warmth to include morality, Kervyn, Fiske, and Yzerbyt also countered that early theoretical definitions of warmth had, in fact, included adjectives related to morality even though morality measures were not included when warmth was later operationalized during empirical tests.

=== Competence ===
People or groups who appear "high in status" are judged as more competent than those with low status. The competence dimension definition and prediction on the basis of status has been robust in the literature, and as such, has not faced the same criticism as the warmth dimension. Durante et al. (2013) cross-cultural review of the literature reported an average correlation between status and competence of r = .9 (range = .74–.99, all ps < .001).

== Historical background ==
Prejudice has been deconstructed and debated by social psychologists for over eight decades. Early stereotype research, exemplified by the work of Gordon Allport (1954), concentrated on negative stereotypes within a binary in-group/out-group model. In contrast to prior "us" vs. "them" approaches, the SCM's 2x2 framework created new room for mixed out-group orientations i.e. groups stereotyped to be low warmth/high competence and low competence/high warmth. The multiple out-group categories accounted for a wider variety of out-group directed treatment than prior work.

The SCM broke from former research literature with a mixed stereotype approach that formalized multiple out-group categories. However, the model's dimensions – warmth and competence – have a long history in psychology literature. In particular, Rosenberg, Nelson, and Vivekananthan's 1968 theory of social judgments, which included social (good/bad) and intellectual (good/bad), was an early version of the warmth competence dimensions. Fiske et al. (2002), also credited their decision to adopt a dual warmth/competence model to a 1997 study from Bogdan Wojciszke's laboratory, which found that warmth and competence accounted for 82% of the variance in social perceptions of daily behaviors.

== Behaviors from Intergroup Affect and Stereotypes (BIAS) Map ==
To further develop the SCM, Cuddy, Fiske, and Glick (2007) tested a causal model of stereotype development in each of the SCM's four quadrants, which linked social structure (environmental context) to the development of new cognitive explanations (stereotypes), which then provoke affect (emotion), and ultimately lead to action tendencies (behavior). The researchers refer to the integrated behavioral and stereotype content model framework as the behaviors from intergroup affect and stereotypes (BIAS) map. The BIAS map's behavioral action tendencies include an active/passive spectrum and harm/facilitation spectrum. The active/passive spectrum distinguishes behaviors that are either intentionally directed at the out-group (active) or behaviors that affect the out-group but do not require noticeable effort (passive). The second behavior spectrum, harm/facilitation, is included in the BIAS Map to differentiate out-groups that the in-group is positioned to either assist or to harm. Each stereotype group quadrant is assigned two behavioral tendencies. Thus, common cultural stereotypes dictate if a social group will either be on the receiving end of cooperative behavior (active or passive) or be subjected to harmful behavior (active or passive).

=== The BIAS Map Quadrants ===
==== 1) (High) Warmth / (High) Competence ====
- Emotion: Admiration
- Behavior: Active facilitation
- Description: The in-group, i.e., the group to which an observer personally belongs, close allies, and societal reference groups (e.g., cultural default groups such as the middle class, heterosexuals) tend to be rated as high on both dimensions. However, there are differences between in-group perceptions between Western and Eastern cultures, with only Western cultures displaying this in-group favoritism.

==== 2) (High) Warmth / (Low) Competence ====
- Emotion: Pity
- Behavior: Passive facilitation
- Description: According to stereotype surveys conducted in the U.S., some commonly pitied out-groups include the elderly and mentally disabled. Out-groups that are pitied are within the in-group's moral framework, but are often isolated from society. As an example, the elderly, who are pitied, will either receive passive harm, often in the form of isolation in nursing homes, or active facilitation displayed through elderly charities or community service.

==== 3) (Low) Warmth / (High) Competence ====
- Emotion: Envy
- Behavior: Passive harm
- Description: Out groups that are seen as lacking warmth and possessing high competency will evoke envy. Studies on US stereotypes identified wealthy Americans, Asian Americans, and members in the Jewish community in the high competency/low warmth out-group category.

==== 4) (Low) Warmth / (Low) Competence ====
- Emotion: Contempt
- Behavior: Active harm
- Description: Out-groups that are appraised with low warmth and low competency are subject to the greatest amount of hostility. Groups that are subjected to the low/low category commonly include the homeless and welfare recipients.

== Warmth and competence interactions ==
=== Warmth and competence as distinct dimensions ===
Warmth and competence are conceptually orthogonal, i.e. non overlapping, and correspondingly a high rating in one dimension can be companied with either a low or high definition in the other dimension without triggering cognitive dissonance. Warmth and competence also function separately within an individual's ego defense mechanism. A 2009 study by Collange, Fiske and Sanitioso found that when participants' own competence was threatened, they were more likely to degrade (or diminish) their perceptions of target group members who had low warmth/high competence stereotypes. This study supports the claim that ego defense mechanisms are dimension specific; if a person experiences a threat to their level of competence, they will reduce their rating of others stereotyped to be highly competent, but will not downgrade their perception of those groups stereotyped to be high on warmth.

=== Warmth/competence trade off ===
Despite conceptual independence, appraisals of warmth and competence are not fully independent. A 2005 experimental study by Judd et al. reported a trade off between high and low assessments of warmth and competence when directly comparing the relative attributed of two social groups. When the study's participants read a profile about one group, which described them as high in one dimension (e.g. warmth) the study subjects increased their appraisal of the comparison group along the alternative dimension (e.g. competence). Thus there is a tendency toward ambivalent stereotypes when comparing social groups' relative warmth and competence.

== Warmth and competence in other disciplines ==
Studies on warmth and competence have had a major influence on social psychology. Their influence soon appeared in other related fields such as advertising, international relations, management, and persuasion. In public diplomacy, states perceive foreign publics based on dimensions akin to warmth and competence: States determine whether foreign stakeholders warrant caution based on their strategic importance (in alignment with warmth), and whether these publics possess resources favorable to the policymakers' objectives (in alignment with competence).
