= Amy Cuddy =

American psychologist (born 1972)

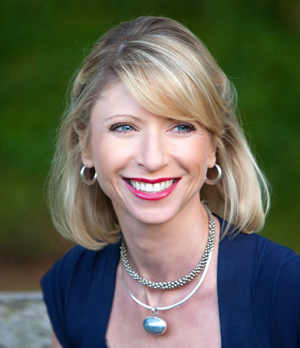
- Amy J. C. Cuddy
- Born: July 23, 1972 (age 54); Robesonia, Pennsylvania, U.S.
- Education: University of Colorado Boulder; Princeton University
- Scientific career
- Workplaces: Rutgers University; Kellogg School of Management; Harvard Business School
- Thesis: The BIAS Map: Behavior from intergroup affect and stereotypes (2005)
- Doctoral advisor: Susan Fiske

Amy Joy Casselberry Cuddy (born July 23, 1972) is an American social psychologist, author and speaker. She is a proponent of "power posing", a self-improvement technique whose scientific validity has been questioned. She has served as a faculty member at Rutgers University, Kellogg School of Management and Harvard Business School. Cuddy's most cited academic work involves using the stereotype content model that she helped develop to better understand the way people think about stereotyped people and groups.

== Early life and education ==
Cuddy grew up in Robesonia, Pennsylvania. She graduated from Conrad Weiser High School in 1990.

In 1998, Cuddy earned a Bachelor of Arts in psychology, graduating magna cum laude from the University of Colorado Boulder. She experienced a traumatic brain injury during college. She attended the University of Massachusetts Amherst from 1998 to 2000 before transferring to Princeton University to follow her adviser, Susan Fiske. She received a Master of Arts in 2003 and a Doctor of Philosophy in 2005 in social psychology (dissertation: "The BIAS Map: Behavior from intergroup affect and stereotypes") from Princeton University.

== Academic career ==
From 2005 to 2006, Cuddy was an assistant professor of psychology at Rutgers University. From 2006 to 2008, she was an assistant professor at the Kellogg School of Management at Northwestern University, where she taught leadership in organizations in the MBA program and research methods in the doctoral program. From 2008 to 2017, she was an assistant professor and then associate professor in the Negotiation, Organizations and Markets Unit at the Harvard Business School, where she taught courses in negotiations, leadership, power and influence, and research methods. In the spring of 2017, The New York Times reported, "she quietly left her tenure-track job at Harvard", where she lectured in the psychology department.

=== Research ===
==== Stereotypes ====
In 2002, Cuddy co-authored the proposal of the stereotype content model, with Susan Fiske and Peter Glick (Lawrence University). In 2007, the same authors proposed the "Behaviors from Intergroup Affect and Stereotypes" (BIAS) Map model. These models propose to explain how individuals make judgments of other people and groups within two core trait dimensions, warmth and competence, and to discern how these judgments shape and motivate our social emotions, intentions, and behaviors.

==== Power posing ====
In 2010, Cuddy, Dana Carney and Andy Yap published the results of an experiment on how nonverbal expressions of power (such as expansive, open, space-occupying postures) affect people's feelings, behaviors, and hormone levels. In particular, they claimed that adopting body postures associated with dominance and power ("power posing") for as little as two minutes can increase testosterone, decrease cortisol, increase appetite for risk, and cause better performance in job interviews. This was widely reported in popular media. David Brooks summarized the findings, "If you act powerfully, you will begin to think powerfully."

Other researchers tried to replicate this experiment with a larger group of participants and a double-blind setup. The experimenters found that power posing increased subjective feelings of power, but did not affect hormones or actual risk tolerance. They published their results in Psychological Science. Though Cuddy and others are continuing to carry out research into power posing, Carney has disavowed the original results. The theory is often cited as an example of the replication crisis in psychology, in which initially seductive theories cannot be replicated in follow-up experiments.

== Publications ==
Books

In December 2015 Cuddy published a self-help book advocating power posing, Presence: Bringing Your Boldest Self to Your Biggest Challenges, which built on the value of the outward practice of power posing to focus on projecting one's authentic self with the inward-focused concept of presence—defined as "believing in and trusting yourself – your real honest feelings, values and abilities." The book reached at least as high as #3 on The New York Times Best Seller list (Advice, How-To & Miscellaneous) in February 2016. The book was translated into 32 languages.

Academic papers

- Cuddy, A. J. C.; Schultz, S. J.; Fosse, N. E. (2017). "P-Curving a More Comprehensive Body of Research on Postural Feedback Reveals Clear Evidential Value for Power-Posing Effects: Reply to Simmons and Simonsohn". Psychological Science. 29 (4): 656–666. doi:10.1177/0956797617746749. PMID 29498906. S2CID 3675226.
- Cuddy, A. J. C.; Glick, P.; Beninger, A. (2011). "The dynamics of warmth and competence judgments, and their outcomes in organizations". Research in Organizational Behavior. 31: 73–98. doi:10.1016/j.riob.2011.10.004.
- Carney, D.; Cuddy, A. J. C.; Yap, A. (2010). "Power posing: Brief nonverbal displays affect neuroendocrine levels and risk tolerance". Psychological Science. 21 (10): 1363–1368. doi:10.1177/0956797610383437. PMID 20855902. S2CID 1126623., listed among "The Top 10 Psychology Studies of 2010" by Halvorson (2010).
- Cuddy, A. J. C., Fiske, S. T., & Glick, P. (2008). Warmth and competence as universal dimensions of social perception: The Stereotype Content Model and the BIAS Map. In M. P. Zanna (Ed.), Advances in Experimental Social Psychology (volume 40, pages 61–149). New York, New York: Academic Press.
- Cuddy, A. J. C.; Fiske, S. T.; Glick, P. (2007). "The BIAS Map: Behaviors from intergroup affect and stereotypes". Journal of Personality and Social Psychology. 92 (4): 631–648. doi:10.1037/0022-3514.92.4.631. PMID 17469949. S2CID 16399286.
- Fiske, S. T.; Cuddy, A. J. C.; Glick, P. (2007). "Universal dimensions of social cognition: Warmth, then competence". Trends in Cognitive Sciences. 11 (2): 77–83. doi:10.1016/j.tics.2006.11.005. PMID 17188552. S2CID 8060720.
- Fiske, S. T.; Cuddy, A. J. C.; Glick, P.; Xu, J. (2002). "A model of (often mixed) stereotype content: Competence and warmth respectively follow from status and competition". Journal of Personality and Social Psychology. 82 (6): 878–902. doi:10.1037/0022-3514.82.6.878. PMID 12051578. S2CID 17057403.

TED talk

- Amy Cuddy at TED
  - TED Talk: Amy Cuddy: "Your body language shapes who you are" (TED Global, June 2012), about the effect of peoples' body language on their perception of how powerful they themselves are.
    - PopTech Annual Conference, 'Talk of the Day' October 21, 2011

== Awards and honors ==
- World Economic Forum Young Global Leader, 2014
- Time magazine 'Game Changer', 2012
- Rising Star Award, Association for Psychological Science (APS), 2011
- The HBR List: Breakthrough Ideas for 2009, Harvard Business Review
- Michele Alexander Early Career Award, Society for the Psychological Study of Social Issues, 2008
- BBC 100 Women, 2017: glass ceiling team
