= Fritz Strack =

German social psychologist

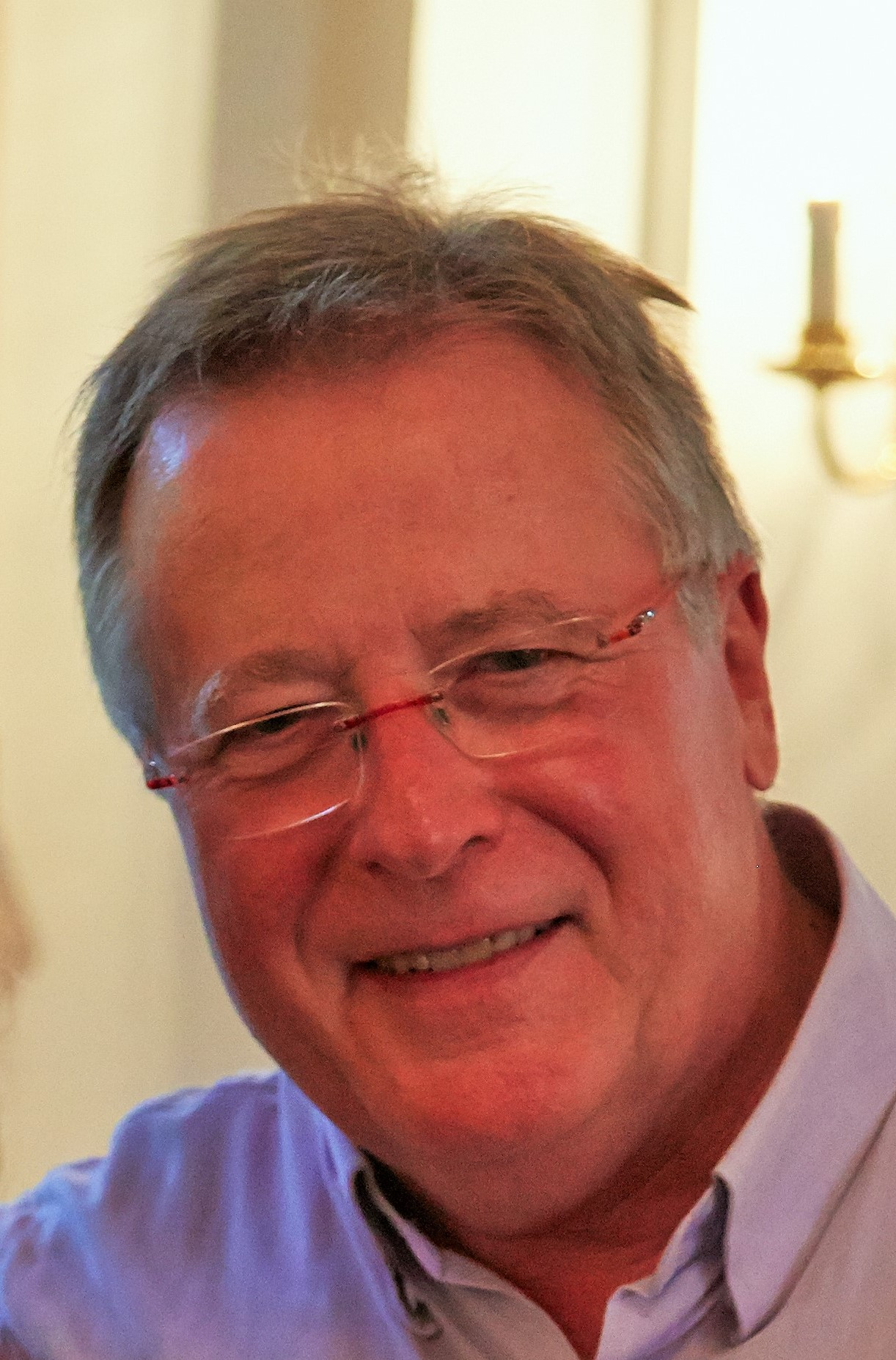
- Born: February 6, 1950 (age 76); Landau, Pfalz, Germany
- Education: University of Mannheim; Stanford University
- Scientific career
- Fields: Social psychology
- Institutions: University of Würzburg

Fritz Strack (born February 6, 1950) is a German social psychologist and professor emeritus at the University of Würzburg. Strack is a member of Germany's National Academy of Sciences Leopoldina and was awarded the Ig Nobel Prize for psychology in 2019.

He was the lead author of a frequently cited 1988 study that provided support for the facial feedback hypothesis.

== Study on facial feedback ==
Strack's study asked participants to hold a pen in their mouths in such a way as to make them either smile or frown, and then had them rate how funny a series of the Far Side cartoons were. In this study, participants who were smiling rated the cartoons as funnier, on average, compared to those who were frowning. In 2016, a study by a separate research team was published which failed to replicate the original study's results. Strack himself suggested that the negative results of the replication study may have been caused by its researchers' use of a video camera to record the participants' responses. He also took issue with the replication study's choice of the same cartoons that had originally been used in 1985. Subsequent research has supported Strack's claim that participants knowing they are being recorded by cameras led to the replication study's negative result. Further evidence has provided additional support for both the pen procedure and the validity of the facial-feedback hypothesis.
