= Douglas T. Kenrick =

American psychologist

Douglas T. Kenrick (born 1948) is an American psychologist who is professor of psychology at Arizona State University. His research and writing integrate three scientific syntheses of the last few decades: evolutionary psychology, cognitive science, and dynamical systems theory. He is the author of over 170 scientific articles, books, and book chapters, the majority applying evolutionary ideas to human cognition and behavior.

== Biography ==
He was born in Queens, New York City, on June 3, 1948. His father and brother spent several years in Sing Sing, but he broke the family tradition and went to graduate school to study psychology. He studied social psychology under Robert B. Cialdini and received his Ph.D. from Arizona State University in 1976. He has edited several books on evolutionary psychology, contributed chapters to the Handbook of Social Psychology and the Handbook of Evolutionary Psychology, and been an author of two multi-edition textbooks (Psychology, with John Seamon; and Social Psychology: Goals in Interaction, with Steven Neuberg and Robert B. Cialdini). He writes a blog for Psychology Today magazine, titled Sex, Murder, and the Meaning of Life, and has published a book of the same title.

== Research ==
1. In some of his early research, conducted with Sara Gutierres, Kenrick demonstrated that exposure to highly attractive people, like those shown in magazines, on television, and in movies, leads people to judge average-looking peers as less attractive, and even to lower their commitment to their current partners. Men exposed to beautiful women, for example, rate themselves as less committed to their partners; women do likewise after being exposed to highly successful men.

2. The research he conducted with Richard C. Keefe, overturned a long-standing assumption that women are attracted to older men and vice versa, because of the norms of American society. This research demonstrated that the pattern of sex differences found in the United States is found all around the world, and is in fact more pronounced in more traditional societies. Further, young men, who are typically highly committed to sex-role norms, are more attracted to women older than themselves. The findings were explained in terms of sex differences in life history – women peak in fertility in their late teens and early twenties, and go through menopause later, men are attracted to cues associated with fertility, not to youth, per se. Men contribute resources to their offspring and can father children well past the age of female menopause. Women do not seek age, per se, but seek men with status and resources, which is correlated with age.

3. Early theorizing by evolutionary psychologists suggested that men were, compared with women, relatively nondiscriminating in mate choice. But research on mate choice sometimes found small sex differences, sometimes large differences. In research conducted with Edward K. Sadalla, Melanie R. Trost, and Gary Groth, Kenrick demonstrated that sex differences are small for long-term relationships, where both sexes make a high investment, but very large for short-term relationships, where the differences in minimum parental investment can be much greater.

4. Research with Norman P. Li demonstrated that sex differences are more pronounced when men and women are given a realistic budget, and not asked simply to list their ideal desires in a mate. Forced to prioritize, women treat status as a necessity, and downplay physical attractiveness; men do the reverse.

5. Research conducted with Jon Maner, Steven Neuberg, Mark Schaller, and Vaughn Becker has focused on the implications of evolutionarily important motivational states on ongoing cognitive processes. This research has demonstrated that people in a self-protective frame of mind are sensitized to potential threats from outgroup males, interpreting neutral facial expressions on such men as hiding anger, for example. In a mating frame of mind, on the other hand, men project sexual arousal onto the beautiful women with neutral facial expressions. People are also especially quick and accurate at noticing anger on a man's face, happiness on a woman's face.

6. Research (conducted with Vladas Griskevicius, Robert Cialdini, Jill Sundie, Joshua Ackerman, Adam Cohen and other colleagues) has examined the effects of evolutionary significant motives for a number of complex social behaviors, including conformity, creative display, conspicuous consumption, aggression, and economic decision-making.

== Selected publications ==
- Sadalla, E.K., Kenrick, D. T., & Vershure, B. (1987). Dominance and heterosexual attraction. Journal of Personality and Social Psychology, 52, 730–738
- Kenrick, D.T., & Funder, D.C. (1988). Profiting from controversy: Lessons from the person-situation debate. American Psychologist, 43, 23–34.
- Kenrick, D.T. (1994). Evolutionary social psychology: From sexual selection to social cognition. In M.P. Zanna (Ed.) Advances in Experimental Social Psychology, 26. San Diego, CA: Academic Press. pp. 75–121.
- Kenrick, D.T., Keefe, R.C., Bryan, A., Barr, A., & Brown, S. (1995). Age preferences and mate choice among homosexuals and heterosexuals: A case for modular psychological mechanisms. Journal of Personality and Social Psychology, 69, 1166–1172.
- Kenrick, D.T., Gabrielidis, C., Keefe, R.C., & Cornelius, J. (1996). Adolescents' age preferences for dating partners: Support for an evolutionary model of life-history strategies. Child Development, 67, 1499–1511.
- Barr, A., Bryan, A., & Kenrick, D.T. (2002). Socially shared cognitions about sexual peak: Perceived desire, frequency, and satisfaction in men and women. Personal Relationships, 9, 287–300.
- Maner, J. K., Kenrick, D. T., & Becker, D. V., Delton, A. W., Hofer, B., Wilbur, C. J., & Neuberg, S. L. (2003). Sexually selective cognition: Beauty captures the mind of the beholder. Journal of Personality and Social Psychology, 6, 1107–1120.
- Griskevicius, V., Goldstein, N., Mortensen, C., Cialdini, R.B., & Kenrick, D.T. (2006). Going along versus going alone: When fundamental motives facilitate strategic (non)conformity. Journal of Personality and Social Psychology, 91, 281–294.
- Ackerman, J.M., & Kenrick, D.T. (2008). The costs of benefits: Help-refusals highlight key trade-offs of social life. Personality & Social Psychology Review, 12, 118–140.
- Li, Y. J., Cohen, A.B., Weeden, J., & Kenrick, D.T. (2010). Mating Competitors Increase Religious Beliefs. Journal of Experimental Psychology. In press
