= Fake it till you make it =

English aphorism

"Fake it till you make it" (or "Fake it until you make it") is an aphorism that suggests that by imitating confidence, competence, and an optimistic mindset, a person can realize those qualities in their real life and achieve the results they seek.

The phrase is first attested some time before 1973. The earliest reference to a similar phrase occurs in the Simon & Garfunkel song "Fakin' It", released in 1968 as a single and also on their Bookends album. Simon sings, "And I know I'm fakin' it, I'm not really makin' it."

Similar advice has been offered by a number of writers over time:

Action seems to follow feeling, but really action and feeling go together; and by regulating the action, which is under the more direct control of the will, we can indirectly regulate the feeling, which is not. Thus the sovereign voluntary path to cheerfulness, if our spontaneous cheerfulness be lost, is to sit up cheerfully, to look round cheerfully, and to act and speak as if cheerfulness were already there. If such conduct does not make you soon feel cheerful, nothing else on that occasion can. So to feel brave, act as if we were brave, use all our will to that end, and a courage-fit will very likely replace the fit of fear.

— William James, The Gospel of Relaxation, On Vital Reserves (1922)

In the pseudoscientific law of attraction movement, "act as if you already have it", or simply "act as if", is a central concept:

How do you get yourself to a point of believing? Start make-believing. Be like a child, and make-believe. Act as if you have it already. As you make-believe, you will begin to believe you have received.

— Rhonda Byrne, The Secret, (2006)

== In psychology ==
In the 1920s, Alfred Adler developed a therapeutic technique that he called "acting as if", asserting that "if you want a quality, act as if you already have it". This strategy gave his clients an opportunity to practice alternatives to dysfunctional behaviors. Adler's method is still used today and is often described as role play.

"Faking it till you make it" is a psychological tool discussed in neuroscientific research. A 1988 experiment by Fritz Strack claimed to show that mood can be improved by holding a pen between the user's teeth to force a smile, but a posterior experiment failed to replicate it, due to which Strack was awarded the Ig Nobel Prize for psychology in 2019. A later 2022 study about strategies to counter emotional distress found forced smiling not more effective than forced neutral expressions and other strategies of emotional regulation.

== See also ==
- Faking It (disambiguation)
- "Fake It Till You Make It Some More", episode of Orange Is the New Black
