= Faking It: The Quest for Authenticity in Popular Music =

- Author: Yuval Taylor and Hugh Barker
- Cover artist: Darren Wall
- Language: English
- Publisher: Faber and Faber
- Publication date: April 5, 2007
- Publication place: USA
- Media type: Paperback
- Pages: 400
- ISBN: 0-571-22659-0

Faking It: The Quest for Authenticity in Popular Music is a book written in 2007 by Yuval Taylor and Hugh Barker. In this book the authors discuss the quest for authenticity in popular music and the influence that that quest has had in the type of music that is played and listened, in particular a preference for raw, simple, underproduced music as opposed to sophisticated, complex, carefully produced music.

== Reviews ==
- Campbell Stevenson (15 April 2007). "So that's why Big Bill had the blues". The Observer.
- "Review: Faking It: The Quest for Authenticity in Popular Music, Hugh Barker & Yuval Taylor". Tuned In To Music. 2007-05-19.

== Related ==
Among the artists discussed in the book, the most prominent are:

- Nirvana, Lead Belly, John Lomax
- Mississippi John Hurt, Jack Owens (blues singer)
- Jimmie Rodgers (country singer)
- Elvis Presley
- The Monkees, The Archies
- Neil Young
- Disco, Donna Summer
- Moby, KLF
- Paul Simon, Buena Vista Social Club
- John Lydon, Sid Vicious
