= Steven Neuberg =

American psychologist

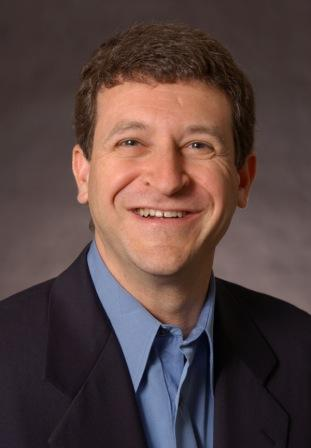
Steven Neuberg

Steven L. Neuberg is an American experimental social psychologist whose research has contributed to topics pertaining to person perception, impression formation, stereotyping, prejudice, self-fulfilling prophecies, stereotype threat, and prosocial behavior. His research can be broadly characterized as exploring the ways motives and goals shape social thought processes; extending this approach, his later work employs the adaptationist logic of evolutionary psychology to inform the study of social cognition and social behavior. Neuberg has published over sixty scholarly articles and chapters, and has co-authored a multi-edition social psychology textbook with his colleagues Douglas Kenrick and Robert Cialdini.

== Academic career ==
Neuberg received his undergraduate degree in 1983 from Cornell University, majoring in psychology; his undergraduate honors thesis, under the supervision of Thomas Gilovich, received the Thomas Arthur Ryan Undergraduate Research Award. He earned a Ph.D. in 1987 from Carnegie-Mellon University, specializing in social psychology, under the supervision of Susan Fiske. After completing a NATO post-doctoral fellowship at the University of Waterloo, working with Mark Zanna, he joined the faculty at Arizona State University in 1988, where he is currently Professor of Psychology, and where he has won multiple teaching awards.

Neuberg is a Fellow of the Society of Experimental Social Psychology, Association for Psychological Science, Society for Personality and Social Psychology, and the American Psychological Association. He has been Associate Editor of the Journal of Experimental Social Psychology, and has served on multiple journal editorial boards and federal grant panels.

== Selected research ==
With colleagues Douglas Kenrick, Mark Schaller, D. Vaughn Becker, Jon Maner, and Vladas Griskevicius, Neuberg has developed an evolution-informed framework for understanding how fundamental social goals (e.g., self-protection, disease avoidance, social affiliation, status acquisition, mate acquisition, mate retention, child-rearing) shape social perception, attention, categorization, memory, decision making, and behavior. In addition to generating a wide range of novel empirical findings, this framework has been employed to re-conceive Abraham Maslow's classic hierarchy of needs.

With Catherine Cottrell and others, Neuberg has employed what he labels a 'sociofunctional approach' to explore issues of prejudice and social valuation. This approach builds on the assumption that human social preferences are significantly (but imperfectly) constrained by their evolved nature as ultrasocial animals and, thus, that people value individuals and groups seen as facilitating effective ingroup functioning and stigmatize those seen as threatening it. Consistent with their theorizing, Cottrell and Neuberg found that people hold qualitatively distinct prejudices against different groups (e.g., that the set of emotions elicited by gay men, for instance, are qualitatively different from the set of emotions elicited by African Americans), and that these prejudices are predictability linked to people's perceptions (whether accurate or not) of the different tangible threats posed by different groups (e.g., to health, values, physical safety). A second line of work from the sociofunctional approach shows that, whereas people highly desire those they interact with to possess traits specific to the nature of the relationships (e.g., to highly value intelligence in a project team member or extraversion in member of a social club), people powerfully value trustworthiness in any individuals with whom they are highly interdependent, regardless of the domain of interdependence.

Susan Fiske and Steven Neuberg developed a prominent model of impression formation (The Continuum Model) that articulates the motivational and informational circumstances that determine the extent to which people employ social category stereotypes versus a target person's individuating characteristics to form an impression of that target. As of early 2010, the Continuum Model had been cited nearly 900 times within the scientific literature.

Neuberg also made contributions to the interpersonal self-fulfilling prophecy literature. Interpersonal self-fulfilling prophecies exist when a perceiver's inaccurate expectations for a target lead that perceiver to act in ways that bring about, even unintentionally, target behaviors that objectively support the perceiver's initial erroneous expectations—for instance, when a teacher's inaccurate expectation that a particular student has little potential in math leads that teacher to be less encouraging to that student, thereby leading that student to perform more poorly than she would have otherwise. Neuberg's work showed that such negative expectation effects are moderated by a range of perceiver and target goals: For example, motivating perceivers to be accurate or to be liked, or motivating targets to be self-presentationally assertive, alters the interpersonal dynamics of the perceiver-target interactions and reduces the likelihood of negative self-fulfilling prophecies.

Neuberg and Newsom helped bring to prominence the Personal Need for Structure scale, created by Megan Thompson and her colleagues. The PNS assesses the extent to which people prefer simply structured beliefs and life activities. The relationship between the PNS, Thompson et al.'s Personal Fear of Invalidity scale., and the conceptually and operationally similar Need for Cognitive Closure scale by Webster and Kruglanski, has been explored in depth.

== Selected publications ==
Neuberg, S. L., Kenrick, D. T., & Schaller, M. (2010). "Evolutionary social psychology". In S. T. Fiske, D. Gilbert, & G. Lindzey (Eds.), Handbook of Social Psychology (5th ed., pp. 761–796). New York: John Wiley & Sons.

Shapiro, J. S., & Neuberg, S. L. (2007). "From stereotype threat to stereotype threats: Implications of a multi-threat framework for causes, moderators, mediators, consequences, and interventions". Personality and Social Psychology Review, 11, 107–130.

Cottrell, C. A., Neuberg, S. L., & Li, N. P. (2007). "What do people desire in others? A sociofunctional perspective on the importance of different valued characteristics". Journal of Personality and Social Psychology, 92, 208–231.

Kurzban, R., & Neuberg, S. L. (2005). "Managing ingroup and outgroup relationships". In D. Buss (Ed.), Handbook of evolutionary psychology (pp. 653–675). New York: John Wiley & Sons.

Cottrell, C. A., & Neuberg, S. L. (2005). "Different Emotional Reactions to Different Groups: A Sociofunctional Threat-Based Approach to 'Prejudice'". Journal of Personality & Social Psychology, 88, 770–789.

Neuberg, S. L., Smith, D. M., Asher, T. (2000). "Why people stigmatize: Toward a biocultural framework". In T. Heatherton, R. Kleck, J. G. Hull, & M. Hebl (Eds.), The Social Psychology of Stigma (pp. 31–61). New York: Guilford.

Neuberg, S. L., Cialdini, R. B., Brown, S. L., Luce, C., Sagarin, B. J., & Lewis, B. P. (1997). "Does empathy lead to anything more than superficial helping? Comment on Batson et al. (1997)". Journal of Personality and Social Psychology, 73, 510–516.

Cialdini, R. B., Brown, S. L., Lewis, B. P., Luce, C., & Neuberg, S. L. (1997). "Reinterpreting the empathy-altruism relationship: When one into one equals oneness". Journal of Personality and Social Psychology, 73, 481–494.

Smith, D. M., Neuberg, S. L., Judice, T. N., & Biesanz, J. C. (1997). "Target complicity in the confirmation and disconfirmation of erroneous perceiver expectations: Immediate and longer term implications". Journal of Personality and Social Psychology, 73, 974–991.

Neuberg, S. L., West, S. G., Judice, T. N., & Thompson, M. M. (1997). "On dimensionality, discriminant validity, and the role of psychometric analyses in personality theory and measurement: Reply to Kruglanski et al.’s (1997) Defense of the Need for Closure Scale". Journal of Personality and Social Psychology, 73, 1017–1029.

Neuberg, S. L., Judice, T. N., & West, S. G. (1997). "What the Need for Closure Scale measures and what it does not: Toward differentiating among related epistemic motives". Journal of Personality and Social Psychology, 72, 1396–1412.

Neuberg, S. L., Smith, D., Hoffman, J. C., & Russell, F. J. (1994). "When we observe stigmatized and 'normal' individuals interacting: Stigma by association". Personality and Social Psychology Bulletin, 20, 196–209.

Neuberg, S. L., & Newsom, J. T. (1993). "Personal Need for Structure: Individual differences in the desire for simple structure". Journal of Personality and Social Psychology, 65, 113–131.

Neuberg, S. L., Judice, T. N., Virdin, L. M., & Carrillo, M. A. (1993). "Perceiver self-presentational goals as moderators of expectancy influences: Ingratiation and the disconfirmation of negative expectancies". Journal of Personality and Social Psychology, 64, 409–420.

Fiske, S. T., & Neuberg, S. L. (1990). "A continuum of impression formation, from category-based to individuating processes: Influences of information and motivation on attention and interpretation". In M. P. Zanna (Ed.), Advances in Experimental Social Psychology (Vol. 23, pp. 1–74). New York: Academic Press.

Neuberg, S.L. (1989). "The goal of forming accurate impressions during social interactions: Attenuating the impact of negative expectancies". Journal of Personality and Social Psychology, 56, 374–386.

Neuberg, S.L. (1988). "Behavioral implications of information presented outside of conscious awareness: The effect of subliminal presentation of trait information on behavior in the prisoner's dilemma game". Social Cognition, 6, 207–230.

Neuberg, S.L., & Fiske, S.T. (1987). "Motivational influences on impression formation: Outcome dependency, accuracy-driven attention, and individuating processes". Journal of Personality and Social Psychology, 53, 431–444.
