= White privilege (disambiguation) =

White privilege is a societal privilege based on skin lightness.

White Privilege may also refer to:

- White Privilege Conference, a yearly conference held in America
- White Privilege: Unpacking the Invisible Knapsack, a 1988 essay by American scholar Peggy McIntosh
- "White Privilege", a song by Macklemore on the 2005 album The Language of My World
- "White Privilege", a song by Sam Fender on the 2019 album Hypersonic Missiles

== See also ==
- Privilège du blanc, a Roman Catholic custom which allows certain designated royal women to wear a white dress and veil in the presence of the Pope
- "White Privilege II", a 2016 song by Macklemore & Ryan Lewis, featuring Jamila Woods
