= White Racial Identity Development =

Racial and ethnic identity model

White Racial Identity Development is a field of research looking at how white identity can develop and affect a person throughout their life. Through the process, White people become more aware of their role in American society, with the power and privilege they hold through systematic racism. Dr. Janet Helms created the White Racial Identity Model in 1992 to provide a way to categorize white racial identity. Another theory, the White Racial Consciousness Theory was created as an alternative to Helm's model.

== White Racial Identity Model ==
The White Racial Identity Model was developed by an African American psychologist, Janet Helms, in 1992. It is a racial and ethnic identity model created specifically for people who identify as White. This theory, heavily influenced by William Cross, has become a widely referenced and studied theory on White racial identity development. This model was created "to raise the awareness of White people about their role in creating and maintaining a racist society, and the need for them to act responsibly by dismantling systemic racism through a framework of power and privilege,". In addition, Helms presented the idea that all people have a racial identity in some way that is influenced by power and privilege.

The White Racial Identity Model is broken into five statuses, split into two groups: Abandonment of Racism and the Evolution of a non-racist identity. White individuals transition from understanding themselves as racial beings and the privilege associated with being White, to taking ownership of and abandoning racial privilege, and finally learning about other racial groups.

Phase 1: Abandonment of Racism

In phase one, the abandonment of racism, White-identifying individuals have no consciousness of their race and privilege until they are met with a disruption related to race. This disruption then challenges the individual's ideas of whiteness and how they play a role in a racist society. Following this encounter, the individual then begins to understand the salience of race and its relevance to power. In this phase, a person moves through three sub-statuses: Contact, Disintegration, and Reintegration.

- In the contact status, many individuals display color blindness because they lack an understanding of racism and have limited contact and experiences with people of color. The individual does not consider racial and cultural differences, but they also do not consider White privilege.
- In the disintegration status, individuals begin to challenge the notion of colorblindness through new experiences. Individuals become more aware of their racial identity and the privileges that come with their whiteness. Guilt or shame may also be experienced by individuals, but if these emotions are dominant, then an individual will move towards the reintegration status. If these emotions are channeled positively then an individual can pass by the reintegration status and move towards the pseudo-independence status.
- The reintegration status is when an individual’s emotions are transformed into fear and anger toward people of color. Individuals choose to avoid racism rather than define their non-racist identity. Individuals struggle to move past this status onto phase two.

Phase 2: Evolution of a Non-Racist Identity

Phase two, the evolution of a non-racist identity, is where individuals begin to reflect more seriously on their identity and how they interact with their surroundings. They begin to make more efforts to interact and learn from different racial groups. Helms wrote that people in this phase are working to "be White without also being bad, evil, or racist". The statuses a person moves through in this phase includes Pseudo-independence, Immersion/Emersion, and Autonomy.

- The pseudo-independence stage of this model describes when an individual starts to understand white privilege and issues such as discrimination, prejudice, and bias. Individuals also support people of color and validate their experiences by supporting the efforts to combat racism. However, individuals do not understand how they can be White and non-racist at the same time. Even though they validate the experiences of people of color, they turn to people of color to confront racism instead of themselves.
- The following status is immersion/emersion, where an individual makes an attempt to connect to their White identity and to be an anti-racist together, unlike in the previous status. Individuals within this status understand and connect with other white individuals with deep concern who are also addressing racism and oppression. Ultimately, White people have an increasing understanding during this status.
- The final status of the model is the autonomy stage. Within this status, an individual has a very clear understanding of their White racial identity. Additionally, an individual within this status is actively pursuing social justice and ongoing self-examination. Individuals are very knowledgeable about racial, ethnic, and cultural differences. Individuals within this status also value diversity and acknowledge their role in preserving racism.

== Measurement and use in research ==
The White Racial Identity Attitude Scale (WRIAS) was developed by psychologists Dr. Janet Helms and Dr. Robert Carter in 1990. It was designed to help understand the attitudes reflecting the five-status model of the White racial identity development (contact, disintegration, reintegration/pseudo independence, immersion/emersion, and autonomy). This scale is widely used for measuring attitudes related towards one's racial identity and racism. It has been replicated in several studies and the scales in this measure are highly correlated in measuring this construct. The WRIAS is understood in two major phases: the first phase is the abandonment of racism and the second phase is reworking one's identity into a non-racist identity. Since the WRIAS scores are meant for research and statistically reliable, they help researchers understand how White racial identity can develop psychological burdens. The White Racial Attitude Identity Scale consists of 60 items assessing white individuals' racial attitudes using a 5 point Likert scale (1 = strongly disagree; 5 = strongly agree). Scale scores are derived by summing the 10 appropriately keyed items for each attitude scale. In this manner each attitude has a scale score that could range from 6 to 60. Carter (1988) reported internal consistency reliabilities of .53, .77, .80, .71, and .67 for the contact, disintegration, reintegration, pseudo-independence, and autonomy scales, respectively.

The WRIAS was designed to measure Whites' progression from an abandonment of racism to a positive, nonracist White identity. While individuals have various combinations of these schemas, there is still an underlying assumption that the schemas do progress from racism to antiracism. The WRIAS has been used by psychologists mainly to assess the relationship between White racial identity and used within psychological counseling. The WRIAS has also been used to explore the relationship between White racial identity and racism. The most significant finding with the White Racial Identity Attitude Scale was that gender plays an important role in determining the effect of White racial identity on racist attitudes. A methodological note about the WRIAS is that it has typically been administered to small numbers of college students in single university settings when used in research. While the WRIAS has provided important findings on the white racial identity, the method of administration do present logistical challenges if it were to be replicated at a different level.

== Critiques ==
There are a number of critiques for the White Racial Identity Model. This includes the singular focus on Blacks and the White-Black relationship. There is concern that there is little focus on White identity, which may be explained by "whiteness" not having its own definition. Other critiques include the developmental stage focus of the model and the similarities to ethnic identity models. This use was not applicable, as racial and ethnic minorities are developing from the oppression they face, while White people are developing from the power they hold. The overall main critique of the model is that it is outdated and not as applicable as it once was.

The theory was created in 1990 and revised in 1995. Although it has been updated and revised, there are many other white identity development and consciousness models that have been adapted from this that some researchers and practitioners see as more relevant. Row, Bennett, and Atkinson created their own theory in response to concerns they had with Helm's model. They created the White Racial Consciousness Theory to address these concerns. They define White Racial Consciousness as "one's awareness of being White and what that implies in relation to those who do not share White group membership." The use of the word consciousness acknowledges that for some this might be a clear part of their self, while for others it may be more vague. There is also the understanding that this consciousness is changing as a person goes through a life full of experiences that effect their outlook.

Another scale was also created as an alternative to Helm's model. Choney and Behrens created the Oklahoma Racial Attitudes Scale, which aligns with the theory of White Racial Consciousness.

== See also ==
- Acting white
- Cultural identity
- Ethnic identity development
- Identity formation
- Identity (social science)
- Racial-ethnic socialization
- White identity
- Whiteness theory
- Critical race theory
