= White identity =

State of relating to being white

White identity is the objective or subjective state of perceiving oneself as a white person and as relating to being white. White identity has been researched in data and polling, historically and in social sciences. There are however polarized positions in media and academia as to whether a positive white racial identity which does not diminish other racial groups is plausible or achievable in the Western world's political climate.

== Background ==
Historian David Roediger has outlined how works, beginning in the 1980s, from writers such as James Baldwin and Toni Morrison, began explicitly discussing "white identity's intricacies and costs". In 1999, La Salle University's Charles A. Gallagher proposed that perceptions of a racial double standard were creating a "foundation for a white identity based on the belief that whites are now under siege". Two decades later, political activist Leah Greenberg referred to a "white identity grievance movement".

A 2016 New York Times piece, describing "a crisis of white identity", analyzed some of the complex political, economic and cultural interconnected factors involved with it:

The struggle for white identity is not just a political problem; it is about the "deep story" of feeling stuck while others move forward. There will not likely be a return to the whiteness of social dominance and exclusive national identity. Immigration cannot be halted without damaging Western nations' economies; immigrants who have already arrived cannot be expelled en masse without causing social and moral damage. And the other groups who seem to be "cutting in line" are in fact getting a chance at progress that was long denied them.

In April 2019, AP covered activist Rashad Robinson's suggestion that 2020's Democratic Party candidates needed to do more than address white identity, by transforming privilege into action that tackled inequality. Defensiveness, or white fragility, have been described as a way of constructing a "blameless white identity".

In 2020, Julia Ebner, a terrorism and extremism researcher, outlined how the subsiding of alternative identities in individuals can cause white identity to become an "all-embracing" centralized medium for interaction in the world.

=== Study of the concept ===
The study of white identity began in earnest as the field of modern whiteness studies became established in universities, and within academic research during the mid-1990s. The work of Ruth Frankenberg, among other significant concepts, considered the relationship between whiteness and white identity and attempted to intellectually "disengtangle each from the other". In 2001, sociologist Howard Winant proposed how deconstructionist methodology, as opposed to abolitionist, could help re-examine white identity and its association to whiteness.

=== Trump presidency and Republican Party ===
Since the mid-2010s, sections of media in the United States have increasingly associated white identity with the emergence of Donald Trump's presidency. The Guardian has reported on the 2016 appointment of Steve Bannon in the Trump administration, in the context of his website being linked with an aim to preserve a white identity.

In a party-specific analysis, Jamil Smith, writing in Rolling Stone, has suggested that under Trump's leadership, "Republicanism is now inseparable from this corrosive notion of white identity." In 2019, historian Nell Painter stated that the Republican Party had been committed to white identity for decades, and since its Southern strategy.

== Extremism ==
In March 2019, the New Zealand Christchurch terrorist attack shooter had named the election of American president Donald Trump in 2016 "as a symbol of renewed white identity and common purpose".

In June 2019, CNN reported how calls by the identitarian movement to celebrate white identity were often accompanied by the incitement of violence against non-white peoples. Brian Levin, professor at California State University, San Bernardino, has described the promotion of white identity and anti-immigration stance as a repackaging of white supremacy. Academic Eddie Glaude has similarly proposed that any expression of white identity is a form of racial supremacism.

== Academic research ==
Professor Rita Hardiman's 1982 White Identity Development was conducted at the University of Massachusetts Amherst. Described as a "process oriented model for describing the racial consciousness of white Americans", the study was a forerunner for later process and data-led models.

In 1990, the White Racial Identity Development by Janet E. Helms explored the perceptions and self-identification of white people. Helms has been credited as developing one of the earliest models which profiles a non-racist progression to white identity. In 1996, psychologists James Jones and Robert T. Carter also researched and produced guidance on the psychological steps involved with achieving "an authentically nonracist white identity".

Polling conducted by Democracy Fund in 2016, 2017 and 2018 found that 9 percent of church-attending Donald Trump voters described their white identity as "extremely important to them", whereas up to 26 percent, who did not attend church at all, reported the same. Political scientist Ashley Jardina's research has disclosed that around 40 percent of whites in America acknowledge some degree of white identity.

Indiana University's political scientist Christopher D. DeSante in 2019 developed How Racial Empathy Moderates White Identity and Racial Resentment. The model, which was analyzed by Thomas B. Edsall, is designed to gauge white identity in the contexts of resentment and empathy for non-whites.

== See also ==
- Acting white
- Becoming white thesis
- Cultural identity
- Ethnic identity development
- Ethnogenesis
- Grievance politics
- Group identity
- Identity (social science)
- Identity formation
- Passing (racial identity)
- Racial-ethnic socialization
- Self-concept
- Social identity
- White Anglo-Saxon Protestants
- White defensiveness
- White identity politics
- White Racial Identity Development
- White savior
- Whiteness theory
