= Not Quite White =

Not Quite White: White Trash and the Boundaries of Whiteness is a 2006 non-fiction book by Matt Wray, published by Duke University Press.

It discusses American society's stigmatizing of poor white people. It includes information on how the word "white trash" was coined and how stigma of poor white people intersects with how whiteness theory is defined. The book covers the entire United States, though Lauren Elizabeth Nickas of the University of Notre Dame stated that the book "understandably" emphasizes aspects of the Southern United States.

== Background ==
Anderson described the author as "the second generation of scholars of whiteness." The author works in the sociology field.

== Content ==
The work is ordered by time period, and ending in the 20th Century.

One chapter made of new scholarship is one about the "hookworm crusade".

== Reception ==
Browne stated that the work has "aggravating but revealing" "conclusions" and that the work "covers most of the layers of human prejudice."

Buccitelli wrote that the work includes "a valuable, expanded view of the dynamics of whiteness" in the time periods of its scope.

According to Warwick Anderson of the University of Sydney, within the work, poor white people are used as "boundary markers" to examine how whiteness is and was defined in the United States. Grace Elizabeth Hale of the University of Virginia wrote that the work mostly summarizes previous scholarship, and that unlike most works about cultural studies, the work does not provide information on imagery and text analysis nor does it have extensive information on social history.

Ray B. Browne of Bowling Green State University wrote that this book, and Becoming Burgeois: Merchant Culture in the South, 1820-1865, examine how "human nature" can be made "condescending and unpleasant".

According to Anthony Bak Buccitelli of Boston University the work places more emphasis on how white people in social classes higher than poor whites perceived poor whites in comparison to how poor whites perceived white people of higher classes, and that the author did not state how poor white people managed the perception of whiteness.
