= Child Identity =

Subject of contemporary humanitarian science

Child Identity is not only a psychological structure, but also a complex subject of contemporary humanitarian science. Identity formation is a complex process that is never completed. When we research the problems of identity we want to answer questions "Who we are?", "Do we choose our identity?", "Is identity given to us or do we create our own?", etc. In a world of change, children are faced with many questions and struggles as they sort out their multiple identities. Children begin to ask identity questions at an early age. "Who am I?" "Who is my family?" "Where do I belong?" "Why does my family celebrate some holidays and not others?". These are all standard questions children ask to determine how they fit into their world.

Erik Erikson (1902–1994) became one of the earliest psychologists to take an explicit interest in problem of child identity. The child identity is a complex socio-cultural phenomenon, which includes a variety of representations of a child about themselves, about the world, about his place in this world. The Child Identity is a dynamic construct that is rapidly changing under the influence of the environment, education and family. In childhood, identity is a dependent phenomenon, there are a lot of the unconscious factors are affecting to behavior patterns, relationships child with world. Child Identity formed under influence of various factors and stereotypes.

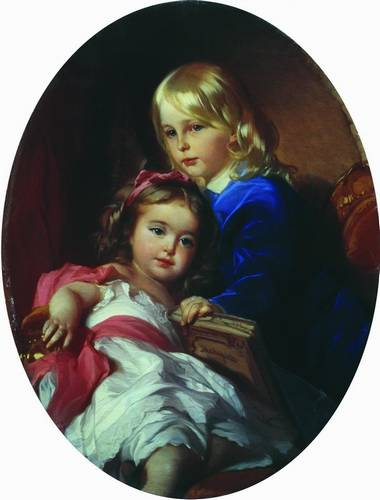
Children of artist (Makarov I., 1885)

== History of question ==
Erik Erikson was one of the first scientists who described the problems of identity of teenagers and crisis identity. The development of identity was one of Erikson's greatest concerns in his theory. When Anna Freud worked with different children, she opened many original forms of their psychological life. For example, she was the first who described phenomenon 'Identification with the Aggressor' (The Ego, 1936). According to her it was a defense mechanism that was used to "protect the self from hurt and disorganization". Anthropologists have most frequently employed the term 'identity' to refer to this idea of selfhood in a loosely Eriksonian way (Erikson 1972) properties based on the uniqueness and individuality which makes a person distinct from others. Identity became of more interest to anthropologists with the emergence of modern concerns with ethnicity and social movements in the 1970s. One of the most interesting research about some elements of ethnic, cultural and gender children's identity was described by Margaret Mead. Jean S. Phinney developed a three stage model of ethnic identity development (1992) based on research with minority adolescents combined with other ego identity and ethnic identity models.

== Socialization and child identity ==
Societies are shared communities with complex codes and organizational structures. Socialization is the process by which individuals adapt to and internalize the norms, values, customs, and behaviors of a shared social group (see Lutfey & Mortimer, 2006; Parsons, 1951). The degree to which children learn how to participate and be accepted by society has important consequences for their development and future lives. Importantly, the social codes that children and adolescents learn are specific not only to nation-states and regions of the globe, but also to historical periods and social groups within larger societies. The socio-historical context is a critical dimension of the socialization of children and adolescents, both with respect to their status within society (as compared to adults) as well as their social roles.

Child Identity is in its general sense self-awareness and other-awareness; how much child knows about their likes and dislikes, their beliefs about who they are and what they think their capabilities are. Identity is one of key part of child's development. As child's sense of self develops, so does their ability to be successful in school and in social relationships. Just as self-esteem is how they feel about themselves, identity is how they thinks about themselves. A child with a strong sense of identity might state, "I am a short person, I like pizza, and I am funny." [9] Relationships with family members, other adults and children, friends and members of their community play a key role in building child identity. Child Identity includes many questions such as problems of gender identity, cultural identity, social identity, national identity and others forms of identities. ( 1)

== New research directions ==
Today there are many new frames for forming identity of a child. For example, hybrid identity is a result of globalization. Therefore we have phenomenon of third culture kid (TCK, 3CK) or 'children of global nomads'. Children raised as global nomads can be the offspring of diplomatic, international business, government agency, international agency, missionary, or military personnel, or indeed of people living internationally mobile lives for any professional reason. Typically, global nomads share a unique cultural heritage. For many global nomads, nationality will form but one part of a complex identity influenced also by the host countries in which they have lived, by the experience of mobility itself, and by a multicultural heritage forged within one or more international expatriate communities. The internet has become a big part of contemporary children's life. In the 21st century, this typically involves engagement in virtual play worlds. As children play video games, aspects of their real world and virtual identities interact and learning takes place. Children's Construction of Identity in Virtual Play Worlds (or online child identity) is one of new research aspects of child identity. Mobile child identity is influenced by his (her) use of media, in particular personal communication media such as the mobile phone. On the other hand, it also implies a view of adolescent identity as mobile, changing and developing moment by moment and over time, as very sensitive to changes in the relations between friends and families, and to the emotional and intellectual challenges experienced and mediated through the use of the mobile phone (among other factors).

== Development of identity ==
Everybody has a sense of self or sense of personal identity. In fact most people have a number of important ways of thinking about themselves that are significant enough to be considered multiple senses of self. The sense of self includes those roles, attributes, behaviors, etc. These sense-of-self associations can be based on any combination of the following occupations, social relationships, familial relationships, abilities/disabilities, spirituality and others. In the first few hours of life, children can tell one smell from another, one voice from another-and they prefer their mother's smell and voice to all others. Attachment is part of the process of identity formation. As infants grow emotionally close to certain people, they associate how those people smell, touch, sound; in this way, they are able to recognize their "special people" early on.

Children as young as four years old have a sense of self that is based on some salient attributes that the child considers important and is maintained over time, for example, "I am the strongest or fastest boy in my class" or "I am smart; I figure things out easily" or "I am good at helping people". Identities are often imposed or at least encouraged by environmental or cultural forces.

Children acquire their sense of self and self-esteem slowly as they mature into adolescents. Furthermore, children do not always feel good about themselves or their behaviors in every situation. Identities are developed over time and may change from time to time and place to place. Furthermore, as children interact with their peers or learn to function in school or some other place, they may feel accepted and liked one moment and alienated the next. Emotional stability and acceptance at home and among school staff are important during these times.

"Construction of identity" is rarely a deliberate, self-conscious process. Early in life, sense of self is associated with the security, protection, and acceptance that infants, toddlers, and preschoolers feel when effectively cared for by adults to whom they feel an attachment. By the late preschool years and early school years, sense of self comes to be additionally associated – positively or negatively – with attributes that parents value and model for their children in the way they live their lives. Over the school years, peer values and peer pressure come to play an increasingly influential role in how older children and young adolescents think about themselves. "Cliques" – the "in crowd" versus the "out crowd" – become important components of identity. Identities that have been strongly developed prior to these years often protect against the developmental difficulties associated with these years.
