= Conor Friedersdorf =

American journalist

- Education: Pomona College (BA); New York University (MA)
- Occupation: Journalist
- Known for: The Atlantic

Conor Renier Friedersdorf is an American journalist and a staff writer at The Atlantic.

== Early life and career ==
He attended Pomona College as an undergraduate, and attended the journalism school at New York University on a scholarship. After graduation from college, Friedersdorf worked for the Inland Valley Daily Bulletin. He began writing for The Atlantic in November 2009. He was an intern for The Daily Dish blog, and in 2010 was hired as senior editor and "underblogger" to Andrew Sullivan. Friedersdorf compiles on a regular basis The Best of Journalism list, which is a curated list of news articles and investigative report, that he disseminates through a newsletter.

== Views ==
In an interview with journalist Matt Lewis, Friedersdorf stated that he has right-leaning views, but that he does not consider himself to be a doctrinal conservative, nor a member of the conservative movement. Writing for The Atlantic, Friedersdorf said that he refused to vote for Barack Obama in 2012 and was supporting Gary Johnson in his bid for president as the Libertarian Party candidate.

Friedersdorf has written articles calling for the abolition of U.S. Immigration and Customs Enforcement and for protecting the right to protest on the Statue of Liberty. He has praised Peggy McIntosh's essay "White Privilege: Unpacking the Invisible Knapsack", saying he would encourage its study in college curriculums.

== Personal life ==
Friedersdorf grew up in Orange County, California. As of 2018, he lives in Venice, Los Angeles. Two of his grandparents were French Cajuns.
