= Waking Up White =

- Front cover of Waking Up White.
- Author: Debby Irving
- Language: English
- Genre: Non-fiction
- Published: January 16, 2014
- Publisher: Elephant Room Press
- Publication place: United States
- Pages: 288
- ISBN: 978-0-9913313-0-7 (Paperback)
- OCLC: 870307859

Waking Up White: And Finding Myself in the Story of Race is a 2014 non-fiction book about the subject of white privilege written by Debby Irving.

== Overview ==
Author Debby Irving's recollections of her own experiences of being an American white woman and coming to terms with the complexity of race in the United States.
