= Mia A. Smith-Bynum =

American clinical psychologist

Mia Smith-Bynum
- Occupation: Associate Professor of Family Science
- Awards: APA Fellow, Society of Family Psychology (2015); University of Maryland President's Commission on Ethnic Minority Issues Faculty Award (2016)

Academic background
- Education: University of North Carolina at Chapel Hill; University of Virginia

Academic work
- Institutions: University of Maryland, College Park; Purdue University

Mia A. Smith-Bynum is an American clinical psychologist who specializes in family science and is known for her research on mental health, parenting, family interactions, communication, and racial-ethnic socialization in ethnic minority families. Smith-Bynum is associate professor of Family Science in the School of Public Health at the University of Maryland, College Park, where she is also affiliated with the Maryland Population Research Center. She is Chair of the Black Caucus of the Society for Research in Child Development.

Smith-Bynum is a Fellow of the American Psychological Association, Division 43, Society of Family Psychology. She was honored with the President's Commission on Ethnic Minority Issues Faculty Award from the University of Maryland in 2016. She also received the Jerry P. Wrenn Outstanding Service Award in 2016 and the Doris W. Sands Excellence in Teaching Award in 2017, both from School of Public Health, of the University of Maryland. She also received the Rosa Parks Labor of Love award by the University of Maryland in 2015. Also she received the Minority supplement award from the National Institute of Child Health and Human Development.

Smith-Bynam is editor of Families in daily life: Macro and micro perspectives.

== Biography ==
Smith-Bynum acquired her Bachelor of Arts degree in psychology from the University of North Carolina at Chapel Hill in 1993. Her undergraduate thesis examined self-esteem and achievement in Black adolescents. Smith-Bynum acquired her master's degree at the University of Virginia in clinical psychology in 1996. Her mastered and investigated physical attractiveness and socioemotional outcomes among African American women. Smith-Bynum completed her Ph.D. in psychology from the University of Virginia in 1999. Her dissertation, supervised by Robert Emery, was titled "Mother-daughter relationships and sexual outcomes in late-adolescents: A study of African Americans mothers and daughters." In a sample of middle-class African American mothers and daughters, Smith-Bynum investigated associations between mothers' parenting styles and the onset of their daughters' sexual activity. In addition, the study documented relationships between daughters' racial identity, mental health, perceived sexual competence, and demographic variables.

Smith-Bynum completed a two-year postdoctoral fellowship in child and family development at the University of Georgia before joining the faculty in the Department of Psychological Sciences at Purdue University in 2001. She moved to the University of Maryland, College Park in 2010. She taught the following courses at University of Maryland, family theories and patterns, African American families and ethnic families and health disparities.

Smith-Bynum's research has been funded by the National Institute of Mental Health.

== Research ==
Smith-Bynam is the Director of the Black Families Research Group, dedicated to conducting high quality research on African American families. Her research lab focuses on parenting skills, racial socialization, health effects of discrimination and racism, and understanding psychological factors that impact young black adolescents within the African American community.

Smith-Bynam's research has focused on the negative psychological effects of racism on African American youth. Her collaborative research has documented increases in long term depressive symptoms amongst African American youth with impacts on their social skills and academics. Her co-authored article titled Racism experiences and psychological functioning in African American college freshmen: Is racial socialization a buffer? examined whether parental racial socialization might reduce the effect of racism and improve psychological functioning of African American college students. In a sample of 247 African American freshmen, the researchers observed that students who had experienced racism had poorer levels of psychological functioning and increased psychological distress as compared to their peers. Parental communication conveying cultural pride and emphasizing cultural resources as a means of coping with racist encounters was found to reduce psychological distress. Black parents who educate their children about racial socialization infuse their home environments with positive affirming images of African American people and expose them to literature and culture in order to create "psychological armor against racial stereotypes."

Bynam has also studied the psychological stress and emotional damage of parents who are separated from their children at the border. Forcible separation, unlike predictable separation such as divorce, incarceration, or military deployment, can result in a sense of helplessness leading to symptoms of post-traumatic stress disorder, nightmares, emotional numbness, and reliving the moment of separation on repeat.

== Representative publications ==
- Sellers, R. M., Smith, M. A., Shelton, J. N., Rowley, S. A., & Chavous, T. M. (1998). Multidimensional model of racial identity: A reconceptualization of African American racial identity. Personality and Social Psychology Review, 2(1), 18–39.
- Smith‐Bynum, M. A., Anderson, R. E., Davis, B. L., Franco, M. G., & English, D. (2016). Observed racial socialization and maternal positive emotions in African American mother–adolescent discussions about racial discrimination. Child Development, 87 (6), 1926–1939.
- Smith‐Bynum, M. A., Best, C., Barnes, S. L., & Burton, E. T. (2008). Private regard, identity protection and perceived racism among African American males. Journal of African American Studies, 12(2), 142–155.
- Smith‐Bynum, M. A., Burton, E. T., & Best, C. (2007). Racism experiences and psychological functioning in African American college freshmen: Is racial socialization a buffer? Cultural Diversity and Ethnic Minority Psychology, 13 (1), 64–71.
- Smith-Bynum, M. A., Lambert, S. F., English, D., & Ialongo, N. S. (2014). Associations between trajectories of perceived racial discrimination and psychological symptoms among African American adolescents. Development and Psychopathology, 26 (4), 1049–1065.
