= White People (film) =

2015 American documentary film

- Directed by: Jose Antonio Vargas
- Starring: Jose Antonio Vargas
- Country of origin: United States
- Original language: English

Production
- Producer: Jose Antonio Vargas
- Cinematography: Matthew Caton
- Running time: 41 minutes
- Production company: MTV

Original release
- Network: MTV
- Release: July 22, 2015

White People is a 2015 American documentary film directed, produced and starring Jose Antonio Vargas, and explores white privilege in the United States. The cast includes Lucas Nydam, Samantha Slavinsky, Katy, and John Chimento. The film debuted on MTV.

== Reception and criticism ==
Hua Hsu, reviewing the film for The New Yorker, characterizes the film as a series of "teachable moments". During one moment of the film, Vargas interviews a white community college student, Katy, who attributes her inability to land a college scholarship to reverse racism against white people, before Vargas points out that white students are "40 percent more likely to receive merit-based funding". Characterizing the film's "conversations at the dinner table and in school cafeterias" as "conversations that look more like interventions", Hsu's review is critical of the film itself, noting that, "all of its epiphanies feel safe and stage-managed, largely because each of the set pieces is presented as a problem to be solved."

Time wrote that "Vargas is excellent at creating a non-threatening atmosphere that encourages these young people, mostly teenagers, to openly express their thoughts – even when not politically correct – about race ... This documentary burns brightly with heat and illumination." Variety said that the special was "generally interesting, but seldom digs farther than skin-deep" and "would have been improved by either a narrower approach – zeroing in on one or two of the focus groups – or by expanding it to two hours." The Atlantic wrote that the "best parts of the program try to debunk common, defiant responses white people have when told that they're privileged."

Other media outlets were critical of the film for promoting white guilt. While The Hollywood Reporter said in a review of the film, "There's so much prospect for challenge and stimulation here, yet Vargas never digs deep, jumping away from these varying tales right when they’re getting interesting (and just in time for commercial break). White People wants to be an agent of change, but it would first need to have more than the ephemeral quality of a Twitter hashtag."

== Influences and impact ==
Many writers used the opportunity to review the film as an opportunity to also comment on perceptions of white privilege outside the film. Hsu opens his review with the remark: "like the robot in a movie slowly discovering that it is, indeed, a robot, it feels as though we are living in the moment when white people, on a generational scale, have become self-aware." Noting that "white people have begun to understand themselves in the explicit terms of identity politics, long the province of those on the margins", Hsu ascribes this change in self-awareness to a generational change, "one of strange byproducts of the Obama era". Hsu writes that discourse on the nature of whiteness "isn't a new discussion, by any means, but it has never seemed quite so animated".

In a The Daily Beast review of the film, writer Amy Zimmerman interviews Ronnie Cho, the head of MTV Public Affairs, who acknowledges "young people as the engine behind social change and awareness", but also notes that millennials (with some overlap with Generation Z) form "a generation that maybe were raised with noble aspirations to be color blind". Ronnie Cho then asserts these aspirations "may not be very helpful if we ignore difference. The color of our skin does matter, and impacts how the world interacts with us." Later in the review, the writer, Zimmerman, notes that, "white people often don't feel a pressing need to talk about race, because they don't experience it as racism and oppression, and therefore hardly experience it at all. Checking privilege is an act of self-policing for white Americans; comparatively, black Americans are routinely over-checked by the literal police."

== See also ==
- The History of White People in America, a 1985 mockumentary film similar in content
- Dear White People-2014 film also exploring white privilege
- Black Lives Matter
