= White Privilege Conference =

Annual conference

- Status: Active
- Genre: White privilege, anti-racism, ethnic
- Frequency: Annually
- Country: United States
- Inaugurated: 2000
- Founder: Eddie Moore Jr.
- Website: whiteprivilegeconference.com

The White Privilege Conference is a yearly conference held to discuss white privilege. Founded by Eddie Moore Jr. in 2000.

The conference features several workshops and groups for students and adults about racism, race, perceived white privilege, sexism, black oppression, racial injustice, as well as discussions of lesbian, gay and transgender rights, as well as Islam and Islamophobia.

== History and founding ==
The White Privilege Conference was founded in 2000 by Eddie Moore Jr., a former diversity director at Brooklyn Friends.

As of 2016, many New York private schools had students and faculty attending the conference.

== Media criticism ==
The conference has been criticized by some conservative commentators known for their stated opposition to affirmative action in the media as nothing more than white guilt and/or sanctioned bigotry towards white people.
