= Ashley E. Jardina =

Political science scholar and author

Associate Professor of Politics and Public Policy at the University of Virginia.

Personal details
- Education: University of Michigan (BA), (MA, PhD)
- Occupation: Political scientist, author

Ashley E. Jardina is a political scientist and an associate professor of Politics and Public Policy at The Frank Batten School of Leadership and Public Policy at the University of Virginia. She is the author of the award-winning book White Identity Politics published by Cambridge University Press in 2019.

Studying for her undergraduate degree at the University of Michigan, she later became a doctoral student there, gaining her PhD. She was hired by Duke University as a political scientist in 2014. In 2015, the American Political Science Association awarded her the best dissertation in race and ethnic politics.

== Career ==
According to The New York Times, a 2017 study by Jardina found that naming Donald Trump or his policies "racist" turned off some white voters, whereas describing these same behaviors as "white supremacy" did not. In 2018, The Economist covered her research into the difference between general white identity and specific racism or animus against other ethnicities, and in 2019, when Newsweek discussed her analysis further, she said "There is a subset of people in the U.S. who feel their white race is important to them and feel the demographics are changing and the privileges and advantages that they have are under attack. That is different from 'I just don't like black people.'"

In March 2019, Pacific Standard reported Jardina's research that "up to 40 percent of American whites feel solidarity with, and protective of, their racial group". Reviewing poll findings, Jardina drew much of her research on the topic from the American National Election Studies, and has said that white Americans began to show patterns of this behaviour since 2000. In 2019, she authored White Identity Politics which examined the identity politics of white people.

== Selected publications ==
- White Identity Politics. Cambridge University Press, 2019. ISBN 978-1108468602
