= Jose Antonio Vargas =

Filipino-American journalist, immigration activist

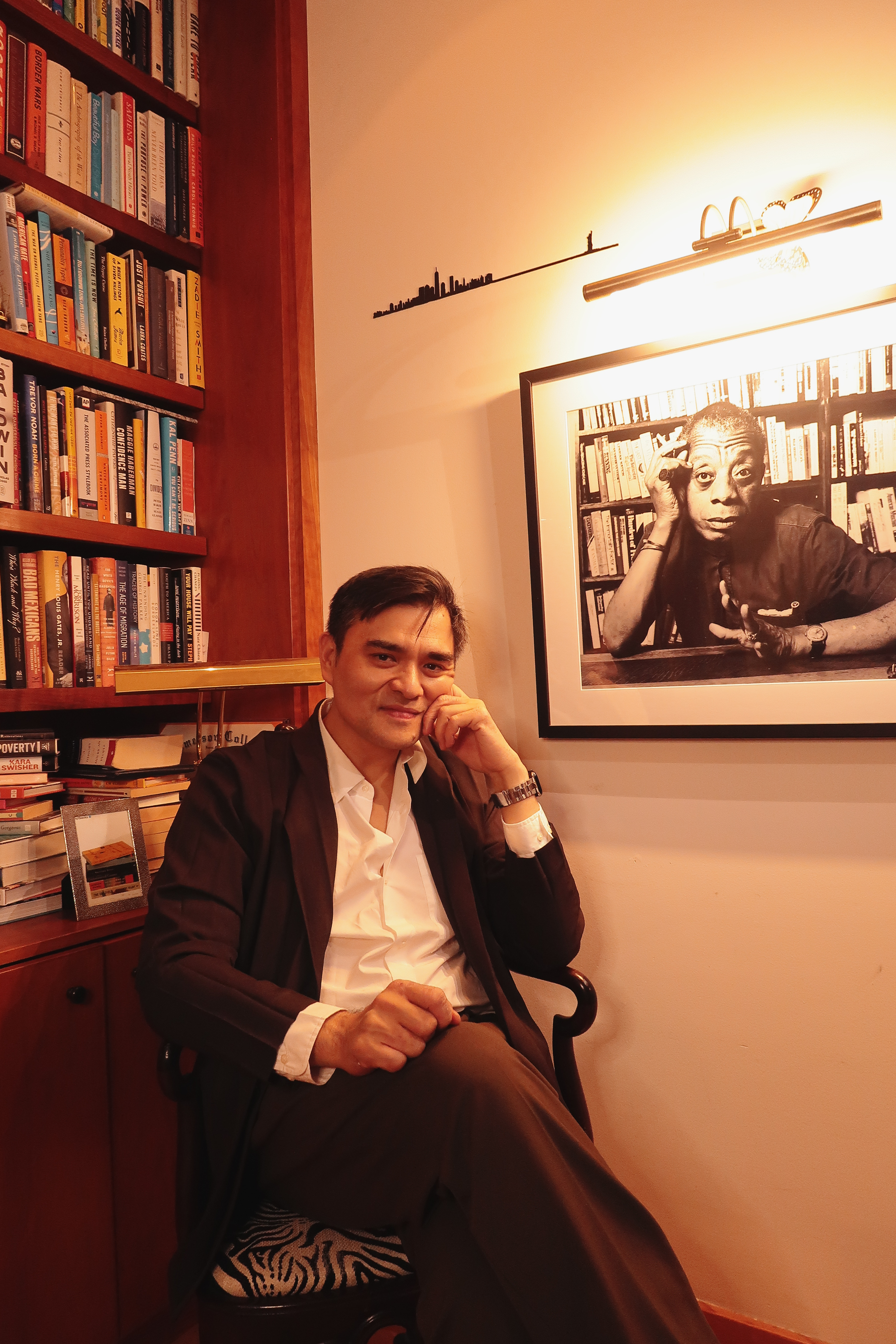
- Born: February 3, 1981 (age 45); Antipolo, Philippines
- Education: San Francisco State University (BA)
- Occupations: Journalist, filmmaker
- Organization: Define American
- Awards: Pulitzer Prize; The Sidney Award; Freedom to Write Advocacy Network award
- Website: joseantoniovargas.com

Jose Antonio Vargas (born February 3, 1981) is a journalist, filmmaker, and immigration rights activist. Born in the Philippines and raised in the United States from the age of twelve, he was part of The Washington Post team that won the Pulitzer Prize for Breaking News Reporting in 2008 for coverage of the Virginia Tech shooting online and in print. Vargas has also worked for the San Francisco Chronicle, the Philadelphia Daily News, and The Huffington Post. He wrote, produced, and directed the autobiographical 2013 film Documented, which CNN Films broadcast in June 2014.

In a June 2011 essay in The New York Times Magazine, Vargas revealed his status as an undocumented immigrant in an effort to promote dialogue about the immigration system in the U.S. and to advocate for the DREAM Act, which would provide children in similar circumstances with a path to citizenship. A year later, a day after the publication of his Time cover story about his continued uncertainty regarding his immigration status, the Obama administration announced it was halting the deportation of undocumented immigrants age 30 and under, who would be eligible for the DREAM Act. Vargas, who had just turned 31, did not qualify.

Vargas is the founder of Define American, a nonprofit organization intended to open up dialogue about the criteria people use to determine who is an American. He has said: "I am an American. I just don't have the right papers."

In September 2018, his memoir, Dear America: Notes of an Undocumented Citizen, was published by Dey Street.

In July 2022, he was appointed to the California State University Board of Trustees by Governor Gavin Newsom.

After 31 years of living in the US without legal status, Vargas announced in January 2025 that he had obtained a 3-year O-1 "extraordinary ability" visa after receiving a waiver of his 10-year bar and prior false claim of US citizenship. Vargas notes that his temporary visa does not provide a pathway to citizenship, but is renewable, which he hopes to do.

== Personal life and education ==
Vargas was born in Antipolo in the Philippines. In 1993, when Vargas was twelve, his mother sent him to live with his grandparents in the U.S. without obtaining authorization for him to stay in the country permanently; his grandparents were naturalized U.S. citizens. In Mountain View, California, he attended Crittenden Middle School and Mountain View High School. He did not learn of his immigration status until 1997 when, at age 16, he attempted to obtain a California driver's license with identity documents provided by his family that he then discovered were fraudulent. He kept his immigration status secret, pursuing his education and fitting in as an American with the help of friends and teachers. He used a Filipino passport and false documents that included a green card and a driver's license to help him avoid deportation.

His high school English teacher introduced him to journalism, and in 1998 he began an internship at the Mountain View Voice, a local newspaper. He later became a copy boy for the San Francisco Chronicle. Unable to apply for traditional financial aid due to his status, with the help of his high school principal and school superintendent, Vargas secured a private scholarship to attend San Francisco State University, where he earned a degree in political science and Black Studies. In the summers during college he interned for the Philadelphia Daily News and The Washington Post.

Vargas came out as gay during his senior year of high school in 1999, a decision he later described as "less daunting than coming out about my legal status". He spoke out against the Defense of Marriage Act, calling it an immigration issue that disadvantages people similar to him from "marry[ing] my way into citizenship like straight people can".

== Journalism ==
=== Work for The Washington Post ===
In 2004, immediately after graduation from San Francisco State, he was hired by the Style section of The Washington Post to cover the video game boom. He became known for his anecdotal coverage of the HIV epidemic in Washington. His coverage was adapted into a 2010 documentary entitled, The Other City. In 2007, he was part of the Washington Post team covering the shootings at Virginia Tech, whose work earned a Pulitzer Prize for Breaking News Reporting.

When Vargas made a pitch for an assignment as a politics reporter for the Post, he told his editor, "You need someone to cover the presidential campaign who has a Facebook account and who looks at YouTube every day." Vargas went on to cover the 2008 presidential campaign, including a front-page article in 2007 about Wikipedia's impact on the 2008 election.

He also wrote an online column entitled "The Clickocracy" on the Post's website.

==== Pulitzer Prize ====
Vargas authored or contributed to three Washington Post articles about the Virginia Tech shootings that were awarded the 2008 Pulitzer Prize for Breaking News Reporting.

In "Students Make Connections at a Time of Total Disconnect" on April 17, 2007, Vargas reported on the role of technology in student experiences during the Virginia Tech shootings. He described graduate student Jamal Albarghouti running toward the gunshots when he heard them, taking out his cell phone to take a shaky, one-minute video that later was aired on CNN.com. "This is what this YouTube-Facebook-instant messaging generation does," Vargas wrote. "Witness. Record. Share." The article also discussed the role of Facebook, which students used to keep in touch during the event. Albarghouti returned to his apartment to find 279 new Facebook messages, Vargas recounted, and another student, Trey Perkins, faced a similar inundation.

Vargas contributed to the article "'Pop, Pop, Pop': Students Down, Doors Barred, Leaps to Safety," which was published on April 17, 2007. Through interviews with eyewitnesses, the story recounted the events of the Virginia Tech shootings. He also contributed to the article "That Was the Desk I Chose to Die Under," which ran in The Washington Post on April 19, 2007. Vargas gained an interview with an eyewitness to the shootings by approaching him through Facebook, he explained to GMA News. "I got him on the phone, we talked for about 25 minutes, and he was the only eyewitness we had on the story, so it was a critical part of it," Vargas explained.

=== Work for The Huffington Post ===
In July 2009, Vargas left the Post to join The Huffington Post, part of an exodus of young talent from the paper. Arianna Huffington introduced herself to Vargas at a Washington Press Club Foundation dinner after overhearing someone mistake him for a busboy.

Vargas joined Huffington Post as technology and innovations editor, where he then created a "Technology as Anthropology" blog and launched the Technology vertical in September 2009 and the College vertical in February 2010.

=== Other print ===
In September 2010, Vargas profiled Facebook founder Mark Zuckerberg in an article for The New Yorker.

== Film, television, theater ==
Vargas's articles on the AIDS epidemic in Washington, D.C., inspired a feature-length documentary, The Other City, which he co-produced and wrote. Directed by Susan Koch and co-produced by Sheila Johnson, the documentary premiered at the 2010 Tribeca Film Festival and aired on Showtime.

In February 2015, Vargas launched a venture called #EmergingUS that will use video and commentary to explore race and the "evolving American identity."

In July 2015, Vargas directed and starred in a new documentary, White People, about the concept of white privilege. The film debuted on MTV, and was nominated for Daytime Emmy and Shorty Awards.

In 2019, Vargas became a co-producer of Heidi Schreck's Tony-nominated Broadway play What the Constitution Means to Me.

Vargas joined the Broadway production of Here Lies Love as a co-producer. The "disco-pop" stage musical, dramatizing the life of Filipino politician Imelda Marcos and set to preview in June 2023, is notable for being the first Broadway production to feature an all-Filipino cast.

== Immigration law advocacy ==
I define "American" as someone who works really hard, someone who is proud to be in this country and wants to contribute to it. I'm independent. I pay taxes. I'm self-sufficient. I'm an American, I just don't have the right papers. I take full responsibility for my actions, and I'm sorry for the laws that I have broken.

— Jose Antonio Vargas

In 2011, Vargas wrote an essay for The New York Times Sunday Magazine in which he revealed that he is an undocumented immigrant. He detailed how he came to discover this as a teenager and kept it hidden for almost 15 years, during which time he worked, paid taxes, and worried that his status would be exposed. Vargas's essay received much media attention and was at the top of the Times "most-emailed" list the week it was published. He received the June 2011 Sidney Award for his essay, an award given by The Sidney Hillman Foundation to what they evaluate as the "outstanding piece of socially-conscious journalism" published each month.

Vargas founded Define American in 2011, a nonprofit project aimed at facilitating dialogue about immigration issues including the DREAM Act, which would provide undocumented immigrants with a path to citizenship through education or service in the military. The organization also invites individuals to share their experiences via video. In 2012, through Define American, Vargas began to monitor the use of the term "illegal immigrant" in the media, hoping to influence news organizations to use the term "undocumented" instead, which Vargas argues is a less dehumanizing term. His targets included The New York Times and the Associated Press. In April 2013, the Associated Press announced that they would no longer use the term "illegal" to describe people and would abandon the term "illegal immigrant"; The New York Times said it also was reviewing its style guides regarding the term. Vargas welcomed the AP decision, saying that he hoped other news organizations would follow their example.

In 2012, Vargas worked with filmmaker Chris Weitz on a group of four short documentaries entitled Is this Alabama? about the effects of Alabama's immigration legislation. The documentary, which advocates the repeal of HB 56, is a collaborative effort on the part of Define American, America's Voice, and the Center for American Progress.

In June 2012, Vargas wrote a cover story for Time magazine about the uncertainty of his life "in limbo" during the year following his revelation that he was an undocumented immigrant. The day after the article appeared, President Obama announced that his administration would halt the deportation of undocumented immigrants age 30 and under, who would qualify for DREAM Act relief, and provide work permits for them, allowing them to remain in the U.S. legally; Vargas, at age 31, however, was not eligible for this program, but greeted it as a "victory for DREAMers".

In the years since revealing his status in 2011, Vargas has become the public face of undocumented immigrants. He presented emotional testimony at a Senate Judiciary Committee hearing in February 2013.

Vargas wrote, directed, and produced the autobiographical film, Documented: A film by an undocumented American, released in 2013 and presented by CNN Films in 2014. It portrays his life from the time he was sent from the Philippines to the United States as a child, his discovery of his immigration status at age 16, his college years, his career as a Pulitzer Prize-winning journalist, and his decision for public revelation of his status as undocumented. The film chronicles his rise as an outspoken advocate for the undocumented, while portraying the personal pain his circumstances have caused him and his family, especially the separation from his mother whom he has not seen in more than 20 years. The film was funded by a former Facebook president, Sean Parker, who also was its executive producer.

Vargas has worked closely with the tech lobbying group FWD.us in their efforts to advocate for comprehensive immigration reform. He referred to the growing collaboration between Silicon Valley leaders and immigrant activists as a "marriage of unlikely allies" that bodes well for the passage of reform. Facebook founder and CEO, Mark Zuckerberg, who generally maintains a low public profile, spoke before the screening of Documented to introduce Vargas and to lobby House members to keep up reform momentum. Zuckerberg recounted his experience tutoring undocumented students as his inspiration for starting FWD.us.

In November 2013, Vargas served on the panel of judges for the DREAMer Hackathon hosted by FWD.us at LinkedIn headquarters. He was joined by Zuckerberg, Dropbox CEO Drew Houston, former Groupon CEO Andrew Mason, LinkedIn founder Reid Hoffman, and FWD.us President Joe Green. The 24-hour hackathon brought together undocumented immigrants and Silicon Valley tech veterans to create immigration reform advocacy projects. The panel selected Push4Reform, a web application developed by a team of DREAMers to connect supporters to Congress, as the winning advocacy tool.

On July 15, 2014, Vargas was arrested by immigration authorities while trying to leave the border town of McAllen, Texas. Vargas was there for a vigil organized by United We Dream, outside a shelter for recently released Central American migrants. He had a camera crew from Define American with him to interview and film undocumented immigrant minor children from Central America. Vargas later wrote that he did not realize until he was there that he would have to cross through a U.S. Customs and Border Protection checkpoint to leave the Rio Grande Valley. He went through airport security with his Philippine passport and a pocket-size copy of the United States Constitution. Initially, he was cleared by the Transportation Security Administration, but a border agent took his passport, reviewed his documents, asked him some questions, placed him in handcuffs, and escorted him to the McAllen Border Patrol station for further questioning. He was released later that day. A statement followed that the release was because he had no history of criminal activity.

PEN Center USA announced in July 2014 that they were giving Vargas their 2014 Freedom to Write Advocacy Network award for immigration advocacy in his writing.

From 2017 to 2018, Vargas served as the Wayne Morse Chair of Law and Politics, established in honor of the late former Senator, at the University of Oregon. He focused on sharing stories about migrants which are different from the norm.

In June 2018, Vargas received criticism for circulating an image of a little boy crying behind a fence on Twitter, using the caption "This is what happens when a government believes people are 'illegal.' Kids in cages." It garnered more than 35,000 likes and 24,000 retweets. It was later discovered that the image was sourced from a private Facebook account and was taken out of context, as the photo was actually from a staged protest against U.S. President Trump's immigration policy in Dallas, Texas, on June 10, 2018. Vargas received many calls to remove the photo from Twitter, including from actor Misha Collins who said Vargas was guilty of "the same misinformation as Trump and you are giving fodder to the other side." Vargas, however, stood by his original tweets, saying "Read what I wrote. All I said [about] the photo was this is what happens when a gov't considers people 'illegal.'"

== Awards and recognitions ==
- 2015: Vargas received the Salem Award for Human Rights and Social Justice for his advocacy for immigration rights.
- 2015: Vargas received an honorary Doctor of Laws degree from Colby College.
- 2015: Vargas was named one of Out Magazine's "Out100", which celebrates 100 compelling people who have had a hand in moving forward LGBTQ rights.
- 2016: Vargas received the José Esteban Muñoz award from CLAGS: The Center for LGBTQ Studies, an award given to an individual who promotes Queer Studies in their work or activism.
- 2017: Vargas received an honorary doctorate degree from John Jay College of Criminal Justice.
- 2019: Vargas received an honorary Doctor of Humane Letters degree from Emerson College.
- 2019: The new Jose Antonio Vargas Elementary School opened in the Mountain View, California, school district where Vargas attended middle and high school.
