= Lawrence Blum =

American philosopher

- Born: Lawrence Alan Blum; April 16, 1943 (age 83); Baltimore, Maryland, U.S.
- Spouse: Judy Smith
- Awards: Fellow of the National Endowment for the Humanities (1986–87, 1995–96)

Education
- Education: Princeton University, Linacre College, Oxford, Harvard University
- Thesis: Some Kantian views regarding the moral significance of altruism and altruistic feeling (1974)

Philosophical work
- Main interests: Moral philosophy, philosophy of education, philosophy of race
- Notable works: "I'm Not a Racist, But . . .": The Moral Quandary of Race (2002), High Schools, Race, and America’s Future: What Students Can Teach Us About Morality, Diversity, and Community (2012)

Lawrence Alan Blum (born April 16, 1943) is an American philosopher who is Distinguished Professor of Liberal Arts and Education and Emeritus Professor of Philosophy at the University of Massachusetts, Boston. He is known for his work in the philosophy of education, moral philosophy, and race.

== Scholarship ==
Blum's work as a scholar has focused heavily on the topic of white privilege.

In Blum's analysis of the underlying structure of white privilege, he identifies a concept which he refers to as "spared injustice": the unjust treatment of people of color in situations where a white person would not be scrutinized. His example of this is when "a Black person is stopped by the police without due cause but a White person is not".

Blum also identifies "unjust enrichment" privileges, where whites are not only spared, but benefit from the injustice of others. For instance, if police spend too much effort profiling black criminals, this may afford white criminals an advantage while harming law-abiding black people who are caught in the police dragnet.

Blum describes "non-injustice-related" privileges which afford a majority group advantage over a minority group in ways that are not necessarily unjust, but which are not harmless, either. Those who are in the majority, usually white people, gain "unearned privileges not founded on injustice." According to Blum, in workplace cultures there tends to be a partly ethnocultural character, so that some ethnic or racial groups' members find them more comfortable than do others.

== Publications ==
- I'm not a racist, but-- : the moral quandary of race. (Cornell University Press, 2002)
