= Peggy McIntosh =

American academic and anti-racism activist

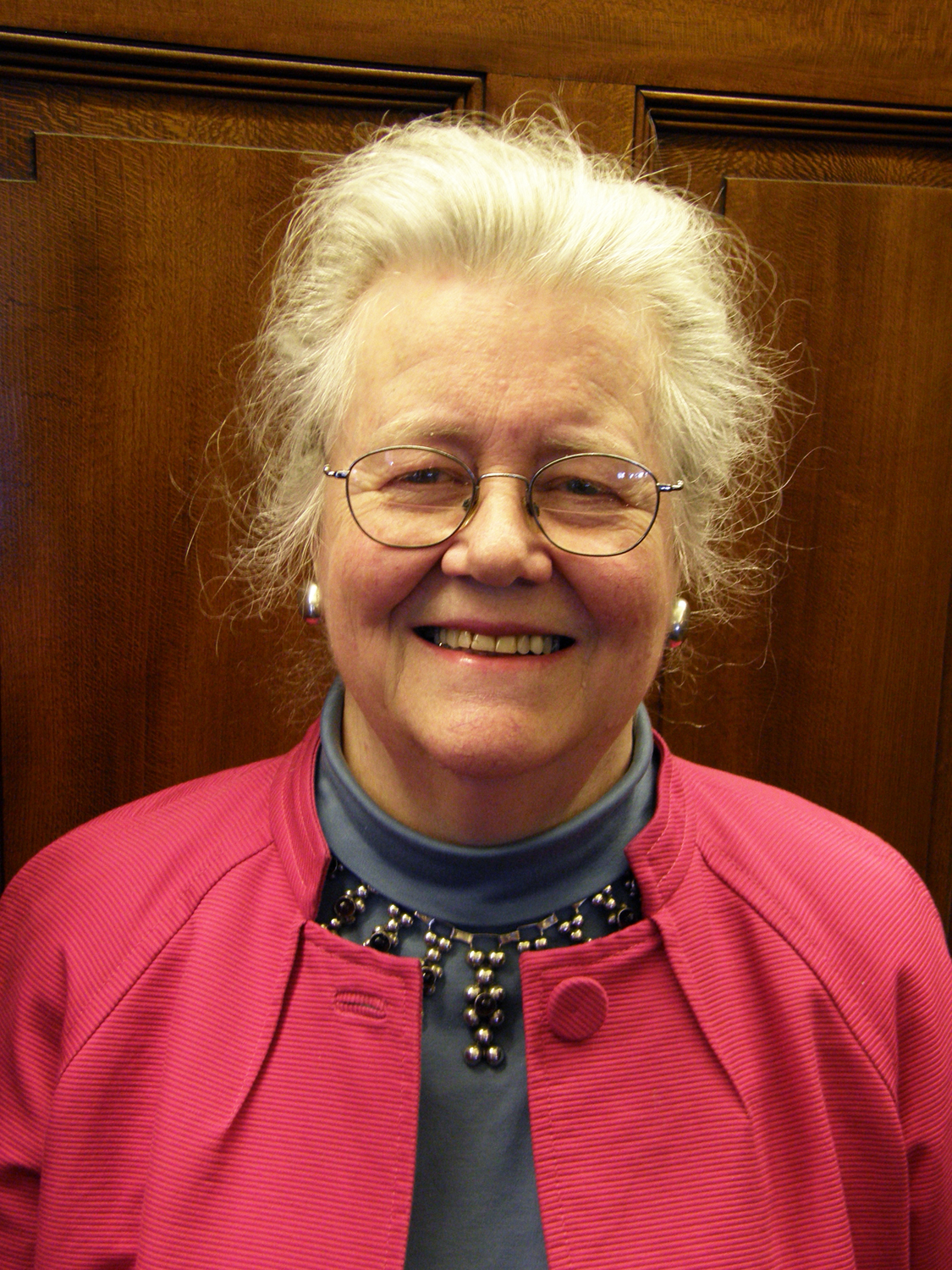
- Born: Margaret Vance Means; November 7, 1934 (age 91); New York City, New York, U.S.
- Education: Harvard University (BA, MA, PhD); University College London
- Occupations: Senior Research Scientist of the Wellesley Centers for Women Founder of the National SEED Project on Inclusive Curriculum (Seeking Educational Equity & Diversity) Director of the Rocky Mountain Women's Institute Consulting Editor to Sage: A Scholarly Journal on Black Women
- Employer: Wellesley Centers for Women Wellesley College
- Known for: Writing on white and male privilege, privilege systems, five interactive phases of curricular revision, and feelings of fraudulence
- Website: WCW Bio SEED Bio

Peggy McIntosh (born November 7, 1934) is an American feminist, anti-racism activist, speaker, and senior research scientist of the Wellesley Centers for Women. She is the founder of the National SEED Project on Inclusive Curriculum (Seeking Educational Equity and Diversity). She and Emily Style co-directed SEED for its first twenty-five years. She has written on curricular revision, feelings of fraudulence, hierarchies in education and society, and professional development of teachers.

In 1988, she published the article "White Privilege and Male Privilege: A Personal Account of Coming to See Correspondences Through Work in Women's Studies". This analysis, and its shorter version, "White Privilege: Unpacking the Invisible Knapsack" (1989), pioneered putting the dimension of privilege into discussions of power, gender, race, class and sexuality in the United States. Both papers rely on personal examples of unearned advantage that McIntosh says she experienced in her lifetime, especially from 1970 to 1988. McIntosh encourages individuals to reflect on and recognize their own unearned advantages and disadvantages as parts of immense and overlapping systems of power. Her recent book, On Privilege, Fraudulence, and Teaching As Learning: Selected Essays 1981-2019, is a collection of her essays published over her career.

== Education and teaching career ==
McIntosh was born in Brooklyn, New York, and grew up in New Jersey, where she attended public schools in Ridgewood and Summit, and spent one year at Kent Place School, before attending George School in Newtown, Pennsylvania. She graduated from Radcliffe College of Harvard University in 1956 summa cum laude with a degree in English. After spending a year at Bedford College, London, she became a teacher at the Brearley School, a girls' school in New York City, where she taught a wholly male curriculum. McIntosh went on to receive her PhD at Harvard University, where she wrote her dissertation on Emily Dickinson's Poems about Pain. She has held teaching positions at what was then Trinity College (now Trinity Washington University) in Washington, DC, the University of Durham in England and the University of Denver, where she was tenured and experimented with "radical teaching methods in English, American Studies, and Women's Studies." With Dr. Nancy Hill, McIntosh co-founded the Rocky Mountain Women's Institute, which for thirty-five years annually gave "money and a room of one's own" to ten women who were not supported by other institutions and were working on projects in the arts and many other fields.

McIntosh has worked at what is now the Wellesley Centers for Women since 1979. More specifically, McIntosh served as the director of college programs at the Wellesley College Center for Research on Women, where she educated secondary school teachers on how their curriculum could change to be more inclusive of women's experiences. McIntosh argued that all women, not just feminist leaders, deserve to have their history taught. Informing the next generations about what women and other underdogs have been through gives a more holistic view of history.

In 1986, she founded the National SEED Project on Inclusive Curriculum, which became the largest peer-led professional development project for educators in the United States, helping faculty to create curricula, teaching methods, and classroom climates that are multicultural, gender-fair, and inclusive of all students regardless of their backgrounds. McIntosh and Emily Style co-directed the first 25 years of SEED. McIntosh currently serves as a senior research scientist at the Wellesley Centers for Women. She directs the Gender, Race, and Inclusive Education Project, which provides workshops on privilege systems, feelings of fraudulence, and diversifying workplaces, curricula, and teaching methods.

McIntosh was featured in Mirrors of Privilege: Making Whiteness Visible, a documentary film produced by World Trust, revealing "what is often required [of people] to move through the stages of denial, defensiveness, guilt, fear, and shame into making a solid commitment to ending racial injustice."

As a speaker, McIntosh has presented or co-presented at over 1,500 private and public institutions and organizations, including 26 campuses located in Asia.

== Invisible knapsack ==
In her 1988 essay, "White Privilege and Male Privilege: A Personal Account of Coming to See Correspondences Through Work in Women's Studies", McIntosh describes her understanding of "white privilege" as unearned advantage based on race, which can be observed both systemically and individually, like all unearned privileges in society (such as those related to class, religion, ethnicity, sexual orientation, age or ability). After observing and investigating what she calls "unacknowledged male privilege" held unconsciously by men, McIntosh concluded that, since hierarchies in society are interlocking, she probably experienced a "white privilege" analogous to male privilege. McIntosh used the metaphor of white privilege as "an invisible weightless knapsack of special provisions, assurances, tools, maps, guides, codebooks, passports, visas, clothes, compass, emergency gear, and blank checks".

In her original 1988 essay, McIntosh listed forty-six of her own everyday advantages, such as "I can go shopping most of the time, pretty well assured that I will not be followed or harassed"; "I can be sure that my children will be given curricular materials that testify to the existence of their race"; and "If a traffic cop pulls me over or if the IRS audits my tax return, I can be sure I haven't been singled out because of my race."

McIntosh has stated that in order to study systems of advantage and disadvantage as they impact individuals, "Whiteness is just one of the many variables that one can look at, starting with, for example, one's place in the birth order, or your body type, or your athletic abilities, or your relationship to written and spoken words, or your parents' places of origin, or your parents' relationship to education, to money, or to English, or what is projected onto your religious or ethnic background." She believes that all people in the U.S. have a combination of systemic, unearned advantages and disadvantages. She feels that it is not possible to do work against racism without doing work against white privilege, anymore than it is possible to do work against sexism without doing work against male privilege.

In 1989, the original "White Privilege and Male Privilege" essay was edited down and entitled "White Privilege: Unpacking the Invisible Knapsack". Both the long and short pieces showcase the white privilege McIntosh experiences on a daily basis; through an extensive list of examples McIntosh illustrates that white privilege is like an intangible gift of unearned entitlement, unearned advantage, and unearned dominance. Privilege gives white people easier access to political and societal benefits that people of color are denied. This work has been included in many K-12 and higher education course materials, and has been cited as an influence for later social justice commentators.

McIntosh has written other articles on white privilege, including "White Privilege: Color and Crime"; "White Privilege, An Account to Spend"; and "White People Facing Race: Uncovering the Myths that Keep Racism in Place".

== Rocky Mountain Women's Institute ==
McIntosh co-founded the Rocky Mountain Women's Institute with Nancy K. Hill in 1976. The organization disbanded in 2009. The Denver Public Library has material from this group in their archives.

== SEED Project ==
McIntosh founded the National SEED Project on Inclusive Curriculum ("Seeking Educational Equity & Diversity") in 1986. Emily Style, as founding co-director, partnered with McIntosh for the SEED Project's first twenty-five years. From 2001 until 2011, Brenda Flyswithhawks joined them as the third co-director. SEED has become the largest peer-led faculty development project for educators in the US. McIntosh believed that teachers were capable of being the leaders of their own adult development with regard to teaching equitably and inclusively. Monthly peer-led SEED seminars are designed as round-table testimonies about teachers' past and present experiences in life and in schooling. This is a teaching technique McIntosh coined as Serial Testimony, which she developed after realizing that systems of power had taught her to ignore or downplay the experiences of others in order to elevate herself in society. Participants would tell their story one by one in a set time interval without any questions from others. Instead of being told what is correct, she wanted participants to teach each other by telling each other about their own life experiences within the context of the material. Connecting what has happened to them and others with the subject material increases interest in learning and helps them see how they relate to society.

Seminar members, including parents and community members, become more aware of their experiences of systemic oppression associated with their gender, race, class, and sexual orientation, inside and outside of the structures of schooling. The SEED discussions help teachers to develop ways of implementing gender-fair and globally-informed curricula for their students.

Since the first SEED Project meeting in 1987, SEED has trained 2,200 K-16 teachers in 40 US states and 14 other countries, indirectly impacting millions of students. The SEED Project has been funded by private donors, local school support, and 15 foundations, including the W. K. Kellogg Foundation. In 2011, McIntosh stepped down as the project's co-director.

Other Projects

As previously mentioned before, McIntosh has worked on the SEED Project, but she has a few archived projects, such as the Gender, Equity, and Model Sites (GEMS) and a more recent three year plan on improving teacher quality using the results from the SEED Project. This project lasted from 2011 to 2014. It was created in hopes to expand the influence of the National SEED Project to be more inclusive to educators, children, and familles.

== Awards and recognition ==
McIntosh has received four honorary degrees, as well as being the recipient of the Klingenstein Award for Distinguished Educational Leadership from Columbia Teachers College. She was awarded the Harvard University Graduate School of Arts and Sciences (GSAS) Centennial Medal of 2021. The Centennial Medal is the highest honor that GSAS bestows.

== Publications ==
- McIntosh, P. (1988). White privilege and male privilege: A personal account of coming to see correspondences through work in women's studies. Working paper No. 189. Wellesley, Massachusetts: Wellesley Center for Research on Women.
- McIntosh, P. (1989, July/August). White Privilege: Unpacking the Invisible Knapsack. Peace & Freedom Magazine, 10–12.
- McIntosh, P. (1998). White privilege, color and crime: A personal account. In Mann, C. R., & Zatz, M. (Eds.), Images of color, images of crime (pp. 207–216). Los Angeles: Roxbury Publishing Company.
- McIntosh, P. (2009). White privilege: An account to spend. St. Paul, Minnesota: Saint Paul Foundation.
- McIntosh, P. (2009). White people facing race: Uncovering the myths that keep racism in place. St. Paul, Minnesota: Saint Paul Foundation.
- McIntosh, P. (1985). Feeling like a fraud. Work in progress No. 18. Wellesley, Massachusetts: Stone Center Working Paper Series.
- McIntosh, P. (1989). Feeling like a fraud – Part II. Work in progress No. 37. Wellesley, Massachusetts: Stone Center Working Paper Series
- McIntosh, P. (2000). Feeling like a fraud – Part III: Finding authentic ways of coming into conflict. Work in progress No. 90. Wellesley, Massachusetts: Stone Center Working Paper Series.
- McIntosh, P. (2019). Feeling Like A Fraud, Part IV: The Psyche as Singular and Plural. In McIntosh, P. (2019). On Privilege, Fraudulence, and Teaching As Learning: Selected Essays 1981-2019 (pp. 107–118). New York: Routledge.
- McIntosh, P. (1983). Interactive phases of curricular re-vision: A feminist perspective. Working Paper No. 124. Wellesley, Massachusetts: Wellesley College Center for Research on Women.
- McIntosh, P. (1990). Interactive phases of curricular and personal re-vision with regard to race. Working Paper No. 219. Wellesley, Massachusetts: Wellesley Centers for Women.
- McIntosh, P. & Style, E. (1994). Faculty-centered faculty development. In Bassett, P. & Crosier, L. M. (Eds.), Looking ahead: Independent school issues and answers. Washington, D.C.: Avocus Publishing, Inc.
- McIntosh, P. & Style, E. (1999). Social, Emotional, and Political Learning. In Cohen, J. (1999). Educating minds and hearts: Social emotional learning and the passage into adolescence (pp. 137–157). New York: Teachers College Press.
- McIntosh, P., Badger, Chen, J., P. Gillette, P., Gordon, B., Mahabir, H., & Mendoza, R. (2015, Summer). Teacher self-knowledge: The deeper learning. Independent School Magazine, 74(4).
- McIntosh, P. (2019). On Privilege, Fraudulence, and Teaching As Learning: Selected Essays 1981-2019 (pp. 107–118). New York: Routledge.
