= White Privilege: Unpacking the Invisible Knapsack =

1989 essay by Peggy McIntosh

"White Privilege: Unpacking the Invisible Knapsack" is a 1989 essay written by American feminist scholar and anti-racist activist Peggy McIntosh. It covers 50 examples, or hidden benefits, from her perspective, of the privilege white people experience in everyday life.

== Themes ==
McIntosh outlines "invisible systems" at work, as well as the main theme of an "invisible package of unearned assets", examined in the form of a metaphorical knapsack. The essay features 50 of her insights into experiential white privilege, listed numerically. These have been described as "small benefits that white Americans enjoy every day".

== Reception ==
The Atlantic has written that the intention behind the essay was to inspire "self-reflection, enhancing their capacity for empathy and compassion". It has been described by Vice as one of the most authoritative texts on the subject of white privilege, and The Harvard Gazette have called it a "groundbreaking article" and the most important of McIntosh's academic career. It has been cited as responsible for the mainstreaming of discussion of white privilege, becoming a "staple of discussions about bias" in society. In 2018, artwork and studies inspired by the essay had become popular in social justice sections of social media, such as Tumblr.

== Influence on education ==
The essay has become one of the key teaching resources in the study of white privilege in the United States and Canada. In 2016, some New York City public schools assigned the essay to high school students. In 2017, a high school in Caledon, Ontario, incorporated the essay in an 11th grade anthropology class. Conor Friedersdorf recommended including the essay in college curricula.

McIntosh's essay inspired "Privilege Walks", workshops, and other activities to help students identify their privileges.

=== Privilege Walks ===
The origin of Privilege Walks (initially known as "Power Shuffles") is often attributed to McIntosh in the 1990s. Although her essay inspired them, in 2021, McIntosh denied any association with such practices and emphatically discouraged engaging in them:

I did not invent the exercises... and in fact I urge people not to undertake such exercises. They are too simple for complex experiences relating to power and privilege. I don’t know where they originated. They seem to answer a craving for instant one-size-fits-all awakenings. I think they are counterproductive.
