= Ethnic identity development =

How a person's ethnic self-identity develops

Ethnic identity development includes the identity formation in an individual's self-categorization in, and psychological attachment to, (an) ethnic group(s). It is closely related to but not exactly equivalent to racial identity development. Ethnic identity is characterized as part of one's overarching self-concept and identification. It is distinct from the development of ethnic group identities. Ethnic identity development is the process by which individuals come to understand and define their sense of belonging to an ethnic group. It typically begins in adolescence and is influenced by social, cultural, and psychological factors. Researchers have created different models to explain how this identity forms and evolves over time.With some few exceptions, ethnic and racial identity development is associated positively with good psychological outcomes, psychosocial outcomes (e.g., better self-beliefs, less depressive symptoms), academic outcomes (e.g., better engagement in school), and health outcomes (e.g., less risk of risky sexual behavior or drug use).

Development of ethnic identity begins during adolescence but is described as a process of the construction of identity over time due to a combination of experience and actions of the individual and includes gaining knowledge and understanding of in-group(s), as well as a sense of belonging to (an) ethnic group(s). Given the vastly different histories of various racial groups, particularly in the United States, that ethnic and racial identity development looks very different between different groups, especially when looking at minority (e.g., Black American) compared to majority (e.g., White American) group comparisons.

Ethnic identity is sometimes interchanged with, held distinct from, or considered as overlapping with racial, cultural and even national identities. This disagreement in the distinction (or lack thereof) between these concepts may originate from the incongruity of definitions of race and ethnicity, as well as the historic conceptualization of models and research surrounding ethnic and racial identity. Research on racial identity development emerged from the experiences of African Americans during the civil rights movement, however expanded over time to include the experiences of other racial groups. The concept of racial identity is often misunderstood and can have several meanings which are derived from biological dimensions and social dimensions. Race is socially understood to be derived from an individual's physical features, such as white or black skin tone. The social construction of racial identity can be referred as a sense of group or collective identity based on one's perception that they share a common heritage with a particular racial group. Racial identity is a surface-level manifestation based on what people look like yet has deep implications in how people are treated.

== Recent research ==
Recent literature has emphasized that ethnic identity development is a dynamic and non-linear process, especially during adolescence. Rather than occurring in fixed stages, identity formation is shaped by ongoing exploration, commitment, and personal narratives, all influenced by relationships with family, peers, and broader social contexts. According to Branje et al. (2021), identity development involves both stability and change, and adolescents actively construct their sense of self in response to life events and cultural experiences. The study also highlights that stronger ethnic identity development is associated with better mental health and psychosocial functioning.

== History ==
Generally, group level processes of ethnic identity have been explored by social science disciplines, including sociology and anthropology. In contrast, ethnic identity research within psychology usually focuses on the individual and interpersonal processes. Within psychology, ethnic identity is typically studied by social, developmental and cross-cultural psychologists. Models of ethnic development emerged both social and developmental psychology, with different theoretical roots.

=== Roots in social psychology ===
Ethnic identity emerged in social psychology out of social identity theory. Social identity theory posits that belonging to social groups (e.g. religious groups or occupational groups) serves an important basis for one's identity. Membership in a group(s), as well as one's value and emotional significance attached to this membership, is an important part of one's self-concept. One of the earliest statements of social identity was made by Kurt Lewin, who emphasized that individuals need a firm sense of group identification in order to maintain a sense of well-being. Social identity theory emphasizes a need to maintain a positive sense of self. Therefore, in respect to ethnic identity, this underscores affirmation to and salience of ethnic group membership(s). In light of this, affirmation of ethnicity has been proposed to be more salient among groups who have faced greater discrimination, in order to maintain self-esteem. There has also been research on family influences, such as cultural values of the family. Also, specific aspects of parenting, such as their racial socialization of youth, can contribute to the socialization of adolescents.

Relatedly, collective identity is an overarching framework for different types of identity development, emphasizing the multidimensionality of group membership. Part of collective identity includes positioning oneself psychologically in a group to which one shares some characteristic(s). This positioning does not require individuals to have direct contact with all members of the group. The collective identity framework has been related to ethnic identity development, particularly in recognizing the importance of personal identification of ethnicity through categorical membership. Collective identity also includes evaluation of one's category. This affective dimension is related to the importance of commitment and attachment toward one's ethnic group(s). A behavioral component of collective identity recognizes that individuals reflect group membership through individual actions, such as language usage, in respect to ethnic identity.

=== Roots in developmental psychology ===
Identity becomes especially salient during adolescence as recognized by Erik Erikson's stage theory of psychosocial development. An individual faces a specific developmental crisis at each stage of development. In adolescence, identity search and development are critical tasks during what is termed the ‘Identity versus Role-confusion’ stage. Achievement of this stage ultimately leads to a stable sense of self. The idea of an achieved identity includes reconciling identities imposed on oneself with one's need to assert control and seek out an identity that brings satisfaction, feelings of industry and competence. In contrast, identity confusion occurs when individuals fail to achieve a secure identity, and lack clarity about their role in life.

James Marcia elaborated on Erik Erikson's model to include identity formation in a variety of life domains. Marcia's focus of identity formation includes two processes which can be applied to ethnic identity development: an exploration of identity and a commitment. Marcia defines four identity statuses which combines the presence or absence of the processes of exploration and commitment: Identity diffusion (not engaged in exploration or commitment), identity foreclosure (a lack of exploration, yet committed), moratorium (process of exploration without having made a commitment), and identity achievement (exploration and commitment of identity).

Researchers believe and have frequently reported that older individuals are more likely to be in an achieved identity status than younger people. Evidence shows that increasing age and a wide range of life experiences helps individuals develop cognitive skills. This combination of age, life experiences, and improved cognitive skills helps adolescents and young adults find their authentic selves. Adolescents with strong commitments to their ethnic identities also tend to explore these identities more than their peers.

== Factors ==
=== Adolescence ===
While children in early to middle childhood develop the ability to categorize themselves and others using racial and ethnic labels, it is largely during adolescence that ethnic and racial identity develops. Adriana J. Umaña-Taylor and colleagues write about the following concepts as playing key roles during this stage:

Cognitive milestones include: abstract thinking, introspection, metacognition, and further development of social-cognitive abilities.

Physiological changes include puberty and development of body image

Social and environmental context includes: family, peers, social demands and transitions, navigating an expanding world, and media

Ethnic and Racial Identity (ERI) components about process:

- Contestation
- Elaboration
- Negotiation
- Internalization of cultural values
- Collective self-verification

Ethnic and Racial Identity (ERI) components about content:

- Public regard
- Ideology
- Affect (affirmation, private regard)
- Salience
- Centrality
- Importance
- Understanding of common fate or destiny
- Identity self-denial
- Certainty

=== Suburbanization ===
Critical race theory has explored the development of suburban "whiteness" in the United States as representing the racialized and classless fantasy of a heterogeneous white population. This work stands in contrast with earlier studies of white flight that assume a broad or homogeneous concept of "white people" who suburbanize in the post World War II era. The culture of suburbanization in Los Angeles through the 40s, 50's and 60's was represented by the icons of popular culture that were often exclusionary and became hallmarks of a "culture of suburban whiteness".

There were some improvements for African-Americans during the era of New Deal reforms, but the housing policies of the Federal Housing Administration (FHA) and the Home Owners' Loan Corporation (HOLC) made it a practical certainty that nonwhites would not be able to own suburban homes. The HOLC tied its calculus of property values to racial demographics with the most racially homogeneous neighborhoods being given the highest ratings. Based on this, FHA loans were directed to the suburbs, making home ownership in the city out of reach for most residents. The FHA said that loans to support urban homeowners would not be sound investments because of the "presence of inharmonious racial or nationality groups". In a 1933 report the agency acknowledged some fluidity to the concept of "white identity":

If the entrance of a colored family into a white neighborhood causes a general exodus of white people it is reflected in property values. Except in the case of Negroes and Mexicans, however, these racial and national barriers disappear when the individuals of foreign nationality groups rise in the economic scale to conform to American standards of living...

== Academic outcomes and cultural socialization ==
Research also points to the role of schools in shaping ethnic identity and academic success. Del Toro and Wang (2021) found that school-based cultural socialization positively influenced African American adolescents' academic performance. Their longitudinal study showed that when students perceived schools as supportive of cultural expression, they developed stronger ethnic-racial identity commitment, which in turn predicted higher GPAs. Interestingly, identity exploration alone did not lead to better academic outcomes, suggesting that a stable sense of ethnic identity is especially beneficial.

== Models for ethnic identity formation ==
=== Jean Phinney ===
Jean Phinney's model of ethnic identity development is a multidimensional model, with theoretical underpinnings of both Erikson and Marcia. In line with Erikson's identity formation, Phinney focuses on the adolescent, acknowledging significant changes during this time period, including greater abilities in cognition to contemplate ethnic identity, as well as a broader exposure outside of their own community, a greater focus on one's social life, and an increased concern for physical appearance.

Phinney's three-stage progression:

- Unexamined ethnic identity – Prior to adolescence, children either give ethnicity little thought (related to Marcia's diffuse status) or are assumed to have derived their ethnic identity from others, rather than engaging in personal examination. This is related to Marcia's foreclosed identity status. Knowledge of one's ethnicity is "absorbed", which reflects the process of socialization.

Broadly, socialization in the context of ethnic identity development refers to the acquisition of behaviors, perceptions, values, and attitudes of an ethnic group(s). This process recognizes that feelings about one's ethnic group(s) can be influenced by family, peers, community, and larger society. These contextual systems or networks of influence delineate from ecological systems theory. These systems influence children's feelings of belonging and overall affect toward ethnic group(s). Children may internalize both positive and negative messages and therefore hold conflicting feelings about ethnicity. Socialization highlights how early experiences for children are considered crucial in regards to their ethnic identity development.

- Ethnic identity search – During the onset of adolescence, there is a questioning of accepted views of ethnicity and a greater understanding of ethnicity in a more abstract sense. Typically this stage has been characterized as being initiated by a significant experience that creates heightened awareness of ethnicity, such as discrimination. Engagement in some form of exploration includes an interest in learning more about one's culture and actively involving oneself in activities such as talking with others about ethnicity, reading books on the subject, and thinking about both the current and future effects of one's ethnicity. This stage is related to Erikson's ‘Identity versus Role-confusion’, and Marcia's moratorium.
- Ethnic identity achievement – This stage is characterized by clarity about one's ethnic identity. The achievement phase includes a secure, confident, and stable sense of self. Achievement also is characterized as a realistic assessment of one's in-group(s) in a larger social context. In essence, the individual has internalized their ethnicity. This stage is related to Erikson's achieved identity, and identity achievement of Marcia. Identity achievement is also related to social identity theory in that this acceptance replaces one's negative ethnic self-image. Although achievement represents the highest level of ethnic identity development, Phinney believes reexamination can occur depending on experiences over time.

More recently, Phinney has focused on the continuous dimensions of one's exploration and commitment to one's ethnic group(s), rather than on distinct identity statuses.

=== Cultural identity development model ===
On top of Phinney's model, Atkinson, Morton & Sue present a racial and cultural identity development model. The model is split into five different stages that are experienced when individuals attempt to understand themselves within their culture, the dominant culture, and the relationship between the two. The stages include: conformity, dissonance, resistance and immersion, introspection, and integrative awareness. Stage 1 Conformity: the phase in which a person believes that the dominant culture is superior to all others and that their own cultural group is inferior. Stage 2 Dissonance: a person's conviction that the dominant group is superior and that minority groups, including his or her own, are inferior by an event that occurs suddenly or gradually. Stage 3 Resistance and Immersion: the period during which a person immerses themselves more deeply inside their own cultural group, rejecting the mainstream culture while experiencing intense feelings of rage, guilt, and humiliation for having initially chosen to identify with the dominant culture and rejected their own. Stage 4 Introspection: the period of time during which a person experiences some internal conflict but also becomes less hostile toward and distrustful of the dominant group, less enmeshed in their own culture, more appreciative of other cultures, and more likely to learn about their own identity. Stage 5 Integrative awareness: The phase in which a human being achieves better equilibrium, values both his or her own as well as other cultural groups, and develops self-awareness as both a cultural and an individual, recognizing both good and negative contrasts among cultural groups.

=== Social/personality models ===
Social/personality models for ethnic identity, unlike the more known Phinney's model for ethnic identity development derived from Erickson's model of personality development, focus less so on the development stages of ERI and more so on their content -what it means to the person and its impact on said person (concepts typically more explored in personality psychology). Though, like Phinney's model, ethnic identity is still viewed as being multidimensional.

In the meta-analysis done by Tiffany Yip, Yijie Wang, Candace Mootoo, and Sheena Mirpuri, the prominent Multidimensional Model of Racial Identity (MMRI) is detailed along with possible, though conflicting dimensions: the Social Identity Theory (SIT) vs. the Self-Categorization Theory (SCT). These theories differ in their suggestion of the impact high ethnic/racial identity centrality on a person's personality. Social Identity Theory (SIT) suggests that the effects of ethnic/racial discrimination (ERD) will be mediated in a person with high ERI centrality whereas Self-Categorization Theory (SCT) suggests that high ethnic/racial identity centrality may result in more negative outcomes when faced with ethnic/racial discrimination.

== Family and culture’s role in identity ==
Family and culture play a big role in how young people understand who they are. When parents talk to their children about their background, traditions, and how to deal with unfair treatment, it helps kids feel more proud and confident about their identity. Umaña-Taylor and Rivas-Drake (2021) found that this kind of support helps teens build a stronger ethnic identity, which can also help them feel better emotionally and socially.

== Effects ==
=== Psychological ===
Research has linked ethnic identity development with positive self-evaluation and self-esteem. Ethnic identity development has also been shown to serve as a buffer between perceived discrimination and depression.

Specifically, commitment of an ethnic identity may help to abate depressive symptoms experienced soon after experiencing discrimination, which in turn alleviates overall stress. Researchers posit commitment to an ethnic identity group(s) is related to additional resources accumulated through the exploration process, including social support. Ethnic identity development has been linked to happiness and decreased anxiety. Specifically, regard for one's ethnic group may buffer normative stress. Numerous studies show many positive outcomes associated with strong and stable ethnic identities, including increased self-esteem, improved mental health, decreased self-destructive behaviors, and greater academic achievement. In contrast, empirical evidence suggests that ethnic identity exploration may be related to vulnerability to negative outcomes, such as depression. Findings suggest this is due to an individual's sensitivity to awareness of discrimination and conflicts of positive and negative images of ethnicity during exploration. Also, while commitment to an ethnic group(s) is related to additional resources, exploration is related to a lack of ready-access resources.

=== Family ===
Studies have found that in terms of family cohesion, the closer adolescents felt to their parents, the more they reported feeling connected to their ethnic group. Given the family is a key source of ethnic socialization, closeness with the family may highly overlap with closeness with one's ethnic group. Resources like family cohesion, proportion of same-ethnic peers, and ethnic centrality act as correlates of within-person change in ethnic identity, but it is only on the individual level and not as adolescents as a group.

== Identity in different countries ==
Ethnic identity can look different depending on where someone lives. In some places, talking about race or ethnicity is very common, while in others it is avoided. Juang et al. (2021) studied how ethnic identity is viewed in Germany, where the topic of race is sensitive because of the country’s history. They found that ideas about identity had to be changed to fit the local culture, focusing more on things like language, family roots, and where people come from. This shows that ethnic identity is not the same everywhere and should be understood in the context of each country.

== Cross-cultural considerations ==
The concept of ethnic-racial identity is not universally stable and must be understood within specific national and cultural contexts. Juang et al. (2021) explored how the concept of ERI was adapted for adolescents in Germany, where the term “race” carries historical and political sensitivities. They found that interventions originally developed in the United States needed to be reframed to reflect cultural background, migration history, and language rather than race alone. This highlights the importance of adapting ERI frameworks to align with local social norms and historical contexts.

== Limitations of research ==
Ethnic identity development has been conceptualized and researched primarily within the United States. Due to the fact the individuals studied are typically from the United States, it may not be appropriate to extend findings or models to individuals in other countries. Some research has been conducted outside of the United States, however a majority of these studies were in Europe or countries settled by Europeans.

Further, researchers also suggest that racial and ethnic identity development must be viewed, studied, and considered alongside the other normative developmental processes (e.g., gender identity development) and cannot be considered in a vacuum - racial and ethnic identity exist in particular contexts.

Research considers some studies of ethnic developments cross-sectional in design. This type of design pales in comparison to longitudinal design whose topic of investigation is developmental in nature. This is because cross-sectional studies collect data at or around the same time from multiple individuals of different ages of interest, instead of collecting data over multiple time points for each individual in the study, which would allow the researcher to compare change for individuals over time, as well as differences between individuals.

Another research consideration in the field is why certain ethnic and racial groups are looking towards their own expanding community for mates instead of continuing interracial marriages. An article in The New York Times explained that Asian-American couples have been kicking the trend and finding Asian mates because it gives them resurgence of interest in language and ancestral traditions. Further research can be found and explored throughout the many different racial and ethnic groups.

Some researchers question the number of dimensions of ethnic identity development. For example, some measures of ethnic identity development include measures of behaviors, such as eating ethnic food or participating in customs specific to an ethnic group. One argument is that while behaviors oftentimes express identity, and are typically correlated with identity, ethnic identity is an internal structure that can exist without behavior. It has been suggested one can be clear and confident about one's ethnicity, without wanting to maintain customs. Others have found evidence of a behavioral component of ethnic identity development, separate from cognition and affect, and pertaining to one's ethnic identity.

Ethnic identity development points toward the importance of allowing an individual to self-identify ethnicity during data collection. This method helps us collect the most accurate and relevant information about the subjective identification of the participant, and can be useful in particular with respect to research with multiethnic individuals.

== See also ==
- Group identity
- Ethnogenesis
- Identity formation
- Identity (social science)
- Cultural identity
- National identity
- Passing (racial identity)
- Racial-ethnic socialization
- White Racial Identity Development
