= Racial-ethnic socialization =

Racial-ethnic socialization (RES or R/E) describes the developmental processes by which children acquire the behaviors, perceptions, values, and attitudes of an ethnic group, and come to see themselves and others as members of the group.

In a multiracial country like the United States, the phenomenon of minority parents "helping children understand their race/ethnicity and cope effectively with discrimination" is widely seen.

In African American communities, a common manifestation of this is "The Talk", an explanation of the realistic dangers children and young adults face due to racism or unjust treatment from authority figures, law enforcement or other parties.

== Racial-ethnic socialization practices ==
Studies indicate the use of ethnic-racial socialization practices promotes healthy psycho-social well-being and supports the development of a strong-racial identity in children of color. There is a positive association between ethnic-racial socialization with self-perceptions, interpersonal relationship quality, and internalizing behavior. Ethnic-racial socialization's link to psycho-social outcomes are dependent on four practices: cultural socialization, preparation for bias, promotion of mistrust, and egalitarianism. The integrative model proposes parental ethnic-racial socialization practices and the link to psycho-social outcome differs across time and is dependent on the child's developmental stage and cognitive competencies.

=== Cultural socialization ===
Cultural socialization is the mode by which parents of ethnic children communicate cultural values and history to address ethnic and racial issues. Research has consistently linked cultural socialization with positive psycho-social outcomes such as a decrease in anxiety, anger, depressive symptoms, and overall psychological distress as a result of facing discrimination. Studies have demonstrated that children's ability cope effectively with negative experiences regarding their race and cultural background is negated by their parents' practice to impart racial and ethnic pride. Moreover, parental ethnic-racial socialization in some instances has been shown to act as a barrier between the negative impact of racism and discrimination on youth's psycho-social outcome. Among the four ethnic racial socialization practices, cultural socialization has been shown to have the strongest and most consistent positive effects on children of colors psycho-social well-being.

=== Preparation for bias ===
Preparation for bias is the ethnic-racial socialization practice that parents use to prepare their children to have the resilience and ability to cope when dealing with experiences of racism and discrimination. Unlike cultural socialization, studies have not shown a consistent link between preparation for bias and psycho-social outcome for youth of color. Some research indicates how bias socialization may be associated with decreased externalizing behavior such as physical aggression. Inversely, other studies demonstrated that preparation for bias was negatively related to self-esteem. Additionally, bias socialization requires comprehension of complex race relations and thus preparation for bias could benefit adolescents more than young children who are more likely to experience and recognize oppressive systems and discrimination.

=== Promotion of mistrust ===
Promotion of mistrust is the practice by which parents teach youth to mistrust or be cautious of other groups or people from a different cultural background or race. Unlike preparation for bias and cultural socialization, the association between promotion of mistrust and youth of colors psycho-social outcome is not well documented. Research has presented varied findings regarding promotion of mistrust. Some studies find that promotion of mistrust is linked to decreased externalizing behaviors among young children, whereas other studies associate this practice with increased depression and reduced family cohesion.

=== Egalitarianism ===
Egalitarianism is the practice that refers to the principle that all people are equal and focuses on the commonalities among different racial and ethnic groups. Egalitarianism has been an unsuccessful ethnic-racial socialization practice and studies have linked it to poor mental health outcomes for children of color.

Research demonstrates there is an association between the use of ethnic-racial socialization practices and children's self-perceptions, interpersonal relationship quality, externalizing behavior, and internalizing behavior. Parents of color utilize culturally informed and ecologically adaptive socialization practices in order to prepare their children and offer them the tools necessary to mitigate the effects of racism and discrimination on their psycho-social development. For this reason, studies have shown ethnic-racial socialization practices to be an effective tool to promote a strong ethnic-racial development for African Americans in particular, given their long-standing history of stigmatization and oppression in the United States.

== See also ==
- Group identity
- Identity formation
- Ethnic identity development
- Identity (social science)
- Cultural identity
- Passing (racial identity)
- Acting white
- White Racial Identity Development
