= Whiteness theory =

Sociological theory

Whiteness theory is a field within whiteness studies concerned with what white identity means in terms of social, political, racial, economic, culture, etc. Whiteness theory posits that when some Western societies make whiteness central to their respective national and cultural identities, their white populations may become blind to the privilege associated with White identity. This blindness helps preserve positive self-presentation and silence the harm caused by the whiteness, which is commonly described as maintaining white innocence. The theory examines how this blindness may lead white groups to absolve themselves of responsibility while excluding, otherizing, and harming non-white individuals and communities.

Whiteness theory is an offshoot of critical race theory that sees race as a social construct. It posits that whiteness is "practiced" by employing "visible systems of whiteness" that white people use to maintain power to benefit only white people. Critical whiteness theory (CWT) positions whiteness as the default of North American and European cultures. As a result of this default, many white people are not directly aware of the advantages of being white that are conferred upon them through ongoing social practices. Academics who study CWT describe these practices as the "performativity of whiteness", which refers to the historical and dominant socio-cultural processes that uphold whiteness. When this performativity aims to perpetuate racial privilege, assumed racial superiority, and secure the acceptance of dominance, it is referred to as white supremacy. Stemming from the lack of cultural awareness, humanity, and empathy with racial others as a result of being white, whiteness theory looks at the social, power, and economic challenges that arise from disregard or denial of white privilege, and the use of strategies of whiteness to protect white innocence and reassert white space, also known as white degeneracy.

== History of whiteness ==
=== North America ===
Whiteness as a social identity formed in the colonial and post-colonial era. In the colonial era social class was more important than race among white people, however during the post-colonial era, social changes gave non-whites an opportunity to engage freely in the economy and those changes economically threatened lower and middle class white people. Racism and racialization were required tools for distinguishing oneself from non-whites, and preventing non-whites from utilizing their freedom for sustainable growth. The opportunism for gaining an economical advantage motivated the lower and middle class white people to reproduce what whiteness can be in order to have a privileged lifestyle, and it was augmented and legitimized by the surviving plantation bourgeoisie class through social and psychological courtesies for further protecting their own privileges. White race solidarity in upholding whiteness through centuries is one of the strongest and ever growing class collaborationism seen in North America.

== Primary features of whiteness theory ==
=== Whiteness as default ===
Whiteness is a socially constructed concept, identified as the normal and centric racial identity. As whiteness is the standard to which racial minorities are compared, whiteness is understood as the default standard. Whiteness theory establishes whiteness as default, through which social, political, and economic complications arise from whiteness and its creation of color blindness. The ideologies, social norms, and behaviors associated with white culture are the comparative standard to which all races are objectified to.

The defaulting of whiteness establishes a reality in which White people, as victims of their race as centric, do not experience the adversity of those with minority identification. An otherization of minorities can occur with whiteness as a default, where whiteness theory identifies whiteness as invisible to those who possess it, resulting in both intended and unintended otherization. Whiteness as default presents socioeconomic privileges and advantages over racial minorities, which also might go unrecognized by White people that are not objectified by some other standard of adversity.

=== Whiteness as centric ===
As the majority of Americans are White, whiteness is considered the default race of the United States, the existing cultural norms of whiteness are classified as the norms of American culture. Such classifications include stereotypical expectancies of behavior, in which a binary system is created that classifies a person's culture as either "White" or "other." Majority racial status plays a major role for those of white identity creating cultural "norms", as one's behaviors and expectations of how a culture should live and interact is more easily reinforced by association with the majority. Lack of awareness parallels the centric nature of whiteness as majority through self-imposed color blindness, existing through the reality of White privilege.

Whiteness theory studies the way that White identity passively creates the otherization of color. Color is a construct that can be objectified, made from the existence of whiteness as majority and centric. Such a perception whiteness as "normal" leads to an underrepresentation and misrepresentation of minority individuals.

=== White identity ===
The idea of whiteness as "normal" reinforces the idea of racial marginalization, through which an identity of may be created through the antithesis of subjugated "otherized" cultures. Much of White identity is formulated around the absence of an identity. Because there is no association towards being objectified by social, racial, economic, or judicial systems for the middle-class White identifiers, White identity for an individual may be intentionally crafted to suit the wants and needs of the individual. Such a choice of "coloring in" one's whiteness is a reflection of the privileges of whiteness and a lack of diverse community association.

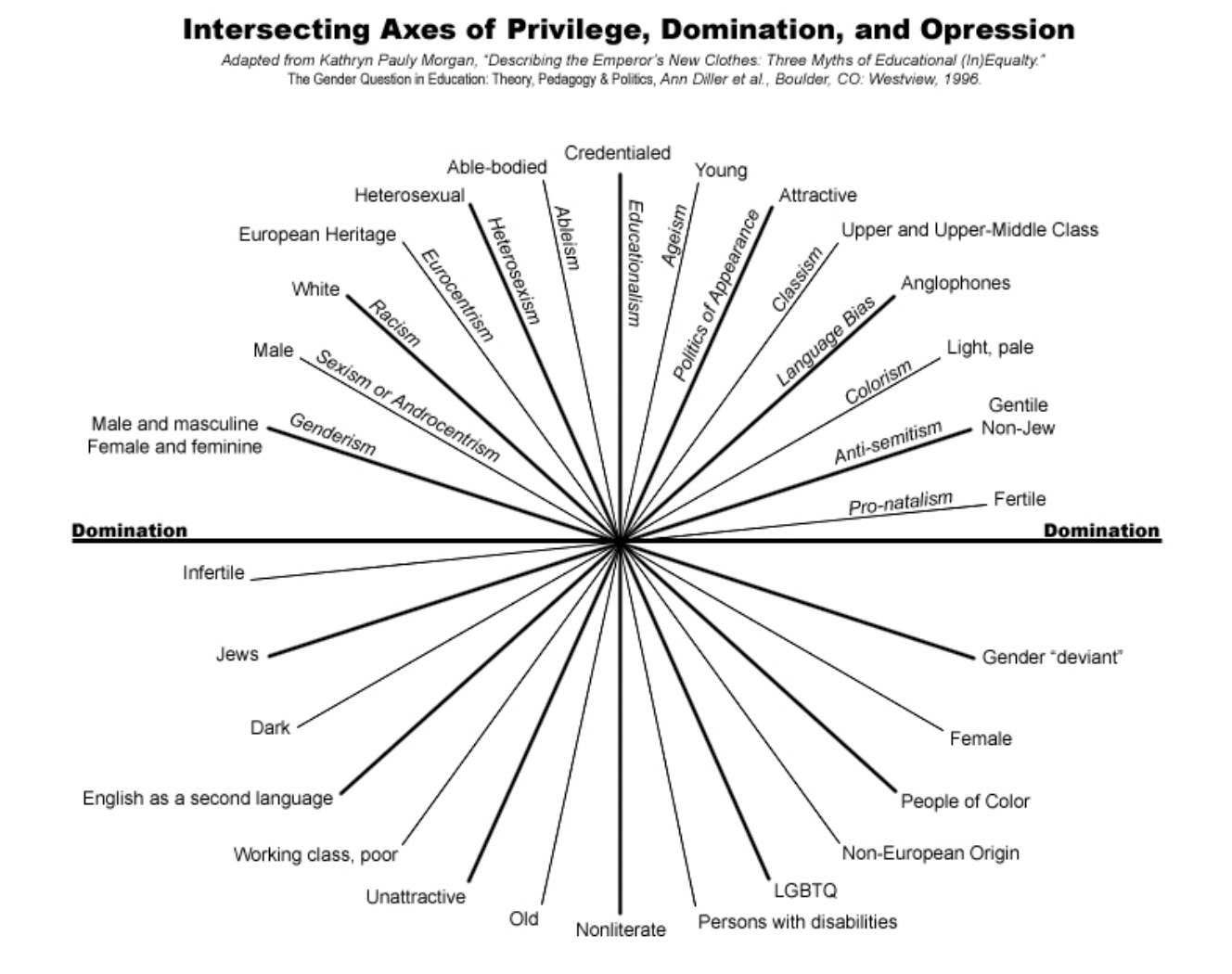
The spheres of privilege and discrimination possibilities based on identity, notably citing whiteness as one of the platforms of dominance

=== White privilege ===
In the United States, White privilege is theorized to exist due to the hierarchy of power distribution, where White men were granted institutional power over minorities in the establishment of the country's political, social, and economic systems. White privilege resides in the idea that White people inherit a color blindness due to their majority status, refuting the existence of racism and racial privilege because of a lack of association with those realities. The privileges of being in the majority are unknown by the majority, paradoxically, because they are the majority and are not subjected to the social trials of being a minority. White people have received a more sympathetic media treatment than black people, for example having been portrayed as mentally ill, after they had committed a serious crime such as a mass shooting.

Lack of discrimination is an underlying principle of White privilege, as the privileges available to the White majority are not as readily enjoyed by those of minority status. Such privileges include, but are not limited to: owning/renting of property, equal racial representation in law and society, unbiased education, assumption of intellectual, social, or financial capability, unbiased credibility. Privilege is multi-faceted in its existence; each of these realities and countless others are the subject of White privilege, as discrimination is faced by minority subjects while trying to enjoy such realities.

=== White bias ===
White bias is in reference to majority stronghold that White people possess. White people have selective preference of granting power and privileges to those of the same ethnicity, referred to as in-group bias. Such strongholds may be categorically associated to the social, educational, economic, political, racial, and cultural privileges associated by the majority White. Institutionally power is granted hierarchically, and in majority, to those who that associate most with the power holders. Racial bias exists as a barrier to entry for many minority power seekers, where a gatekeeping effect is created by those in the majority who are reluctant to pass power onto the minority, whether through qualification-based or discrimination-based motives.

Socially, institutional slavery, then racism has played a major role in the discrimination of not only African-Americans, but as well other minority affiliations as suboptimal. Economically, access to higher-paying jobs and wage gap discrimination are an ongoing discourse demanding institutional change, both as a result of White bias. Politically, racial bias is seen with the highly sought after Presidential office, where America's first black president, Barack Obama, was not elected until 2008, being preceded by 43 White presidents and proceeded by 2 White presidents.

== Critiquing whiteness ==
Communication research revolving around critical race theory seeks to understand the privileges and associations of whiteness. The critical aspect of research involves the realization of white enrichment, where white people have profited from the injustices done unto minorities (see European colonization of the Americas and slavery) both knowingly and unknowingly. Systems in the United States more often than not create privileged realities where white people may succeed more than those of minority identity, also allowing those of white identity to more easily change and manipulate the system to their favor.

A component of critical whiteness theory seeks to understand how white people acknowledge their privileges, as well as the corresponding positive or negative behaviors through their acknowledgements. Unique qualitative research is derived from how normative whiteness is in our culture, associated with how color blindness and privilege blindness affect interracial contexts of communication, as well as the white perception of injustices done unto minorities in America.

== Whiteness and property ==
=== Cheryl I. Harris's concept: "Whiteness as Property" ===
In 1993, legal scholar Cheryl I. Harris published a paper entitled "Whiteness as Property" in the journal the Harvard Law Review. In the paper, Harris argues that the law has historically maintained racial inequality and the privileges of being white, allowing white identity to facilitate a property interest.

Harris writes that the concepts of individuals' and groups' whiteness and their property rights are deeply interrelated concepts, and that white racial identity comes with the allocation of societal advantages:

The meaning of property has changed over time. In particular, whiteness and property share a common premise - a conceptual nucleus - of a right to exclude.

Harris's concept highlights how the race intersects with systems of power, perpetuating inequality. She argues that that system reinforces racial hierarchy across society, relegating people of color to a disadvantaged status. This approach highlights that race is not merely a biological category or an individual-level phenomenon, but a social category. The paper emphasizes the role of race in maintaining systems of dominance and subordination.

Further, "whiteness as property" is characterized as exclusive, only being possessed and used by individuals who possess a white identity. The functions of white property include rights of disposition, right to use and enjoyment, "reputation and status property", and "the absolute right to exclude".

=== White inflation theory ===
Coined by racial sociologist Daniel J. Gil De Lamadrid, white inflation theory emphasizes the role white inflation, or the gradual increase in ethnicities considered white, plays in maintaining whiteness as property. It argues that when an ethnic group transitions from non-white to quasi-white, the boundary between racial dominants and subordinates blurs, threatening the contrast value of whiteness as property. To preserve the value of racialized property, inflationary pressure pushes quasi-whites into whiteness.

White inflation works to maintain the property interest in whiteness by ensuring that the boundary between racial dominants and racial subordinates does not blur. Historically, quasi-whites chose whiteness as property over solidarity with people of color similar to how white working-class Americans chose the wages of whiteness.

== Whiteness theory in communication studies ==
The tenets of white privilege are incorporated into whiteness theory to understand the respective communicative possibilities of each tenet. Studying how white privilege is perceived by white people, how well white people perceive white privilege, how white people think their white privilege affects their identity, how white identity is derived from and conflicts with other racial identities, and how white privilege is perceived by minorities are all a limited set of possibilities created by whiteness theory. These theoretical studies can be manipulated by the following variables of whiteness theory:

- Centric whiteness
- Whiteness as the default
- Whiteness as normative
- Whiteness and rhetoric
- White identity
- White racial culture
- White bias
- White interaction with minorities
- Whiteness and inequality
- White cultural cannibalism
- Whiteness and education
- Whiteness and politics
- Whiteness and popular culture
- Whiteness and gender

=== Whiteness theory in audio-visual studies ===
Spike Lee's 1989 film Do the Right Thing explores whiteness theory through the social, economic, racial and cultural identities of the white characters Sal, Vito and Pino. The film follows another day in the life of Mookie, an African-American man working for Sal's Famous Pizzeria, and the racial tensions that arise between Sal and Mookie's friend Buggin' Out. Sal, Vito and Pino are an Italian-American family who own a pizzeria in a predominantly black neighbourhood in Brooklyn, New York, USA. The pizzeria is thus marked as a 'white spot' amongst black America, representing what colonised America has become; White Americans are working class citizens who capitalise on Black America. This is exemplified through Pino's behaviour toward the African-American customers of the pizzeria through micro-aggressions and slurring of racist remarks while deindividuating Mookie's negative behaviour to be typical of his race, "How come niggers are so stupid?". As Hughey suggests a feeling of threat to the white normality, Pino attempts to exert his white privilege through his actions. For example, Pino explains that he is fed up with being around black people in this neighbourhood and suggests to his father that they sell Sal's Famous Pizzeria and move to their own neighbourhood instead. Whiteness is also shown through Sal's 'Wall of Fame' in his pizzeria which only showcases famous Italian-American individuals. When Buggin' Out calls for the representation of African-Americans to be included on the wall alongside the Italian-Americans, Sal refuses by replying, "Only Italian-American's up on the wall". Sal sees his own cultural and racial identity to be central to his view of American representation and thus is an example of his whiteness. Another example of Whiteness in the film is when a white man's car is soaked by the suburb's citizens enjoying the water from the fire hydrant on the street. The police ask the man to describe the men who soaked his car and he says, "Mo and Jo Black…Yeah, they were brothers". This is an example of what Memmi describes as the 'mark of plural', where these two individuals are homogenously deindividualized and thus marked as raced rather than as individuals.

Whiteness theory is further explored in the 2006 film Blood Diamond by Edward Zwick. The film follows Danny Archer, a diamond smuggler whose ticket out of Africa is a pink diamond found and hidden by a local African fisherman, Solomon Vandy. Danny Archer's whiteness prevails throughout the film. In one scene, Danny pleads to allow Solomon to help him find his family, saying that without the help of himself and the other white people that he knows, Solomon is, "…just another black man in Africa". On several occasions Danny uses the term T.I.A. (This is Africa) when speaking to white foreigners. It is clear here that the use of this term by a white man in a black country details supposed inherent raced characteristics of Africa that are different to that of the white race. Hughey's notion of the White Saviour is perfectly depicted in this film also. Not only does Danny Archer dedicate his time and resources to help Solomon Vandy find the diamond and thus his family, he asks for the help of other white characters such as Maddy Bowen which ultimately result in Danny Archer's sacrifice of his own life and the money from the pink diamond to save Solomon Vandy and his family from definitive death.

== See also ==
- Becoming white thesis
