= Janet E. Helms =

American psychologist known for research on racial identity

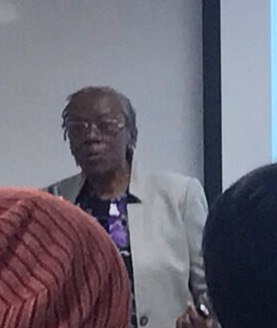
- Born: Kansas City, MO
- Education: B.A. University of Missouri at Kansas City; M.A. University of Missouri at Kansas City; Ph.D. Iowa State University
- Known for: Culture and Ethnicity, Gender Psychology, Self and Identity
- Awards: APA Award for Distinguished Contributions to Education and Training in Psychology (2006)
- Scientific career
- Fields: Psychology
- Workplaces: Boston College

Janet E. Helms is an American research psychologist known for her study of ethnic minority issues. A scholar, author and educator, she is most known for her racial identity theory that is applied to multiple disciplines, including education and law. She received the 2006 Award for Distinguished Contributions to Education and Training in Psychology from the American Psychological Association.

== Life and career ==
Janet E. Helms was born in Kansas City, Missouri. She is the second child and first girl in a family of seven children. She earned bachelor's and master's degrees in psychology from the University of Missouri. Helms initially decided to be a math major because of her father. However, from a young age, Helms knew she wanted to be a psychologist. She said in an interview, "I decided—actually in second grade—that I would be a psychologist and work with autistic children because I read about it in a magazine and that sounded like something good to do." Eventually, she became a psychology major.

Helms attended the University of Missouri as a full-time student and held a full-time job. It was during this time in Helms' life where her interest in racism and multicultural issues began. With the support of her family, Helms graduated with her B.A. in psychology in two years. Subsequently, she received her master's degree in two years at the same institution. Helms' master's thesis focused on attrition and the test scores of black students. She received her Ph.D. in counseling psychology from Iowa State University in 1975.

Helms accepted a position as an assistant professor at Washington State University in Pullman, Washington. Soon after Helms found out about a position she was more interested in through a friend. From 1977 to 1981 she had a full-time academic position in the psychology department at Southern Illinois University, where she began to think of race as something she could address through her research. Helms was always told from colleagues that race wasn't a real topic, so at Southern she began to develop the idea that race is a real topic and can be studied through empirical data. During her time there she could tell there wasn't much literature on race, so she soon published an article focusing on black women. Then she was invited to be on the editorial board for the Journal of Counseling Psychology. This invitation put Helms a little more at ease about her research on race, because she believed the people who invited her to be on the board knew her research was under the area of racial and cultural diversity, and she had confidence that the area was growing. Next, she worked at the University of Maryland, College Park, from 1981 to 1999. She started there as an assistant professor, then was promoted to a full-time professor. While at Maryland she became the co-director of the counseling psychology program and an affiliate for the Women's Study Program. Helms also provided psychological services to clients in a private practice.

In 2000, Helms accepted a tenured faculty position at Boston College where she is the Augustus Long Professor of Counseling Psychology.

== Work interest ==
Helms work focuses on how race, culture and gender can influence one's personality and participating counseling styles. Her work is based in empirical evidence. Helms has studied how it is not the race or gender of the person that affects one's mental health. What affects mental health is the way that people who are in these categories are treated by others. She has found through her research that race has predicted many outcomes, including stress reactions, performance on standardized tests, and the supervisor/supervisee experience. Currently, Helms is looking at the relationship between race and the woman identity regarding women of color.

== Editorial boards ==
- Editorial Board, 1997–present, Journal of Psychological Assessment
- Editorial Board, 1978–present, Journal of Counseling Psychology
- Editorial Board, 1980-1982, The Counseling Psychologist
- Editorial Board, 1998–present, Journal of Multicultural Counseling and Development Ad hoc reviewer for Journal of College Student Personnel, American Psychologist, Journal of Leisure, Measurement and Evaluation in Guidance Journal, The Counseling Psychologist, Journal of Applied Social Psychology, Professional Psychology, Journal of Black Psychology, Psychology of Women Quarterly, Journal of Adolescent Psychology, Community Psychology, Journal of Personality and Social Psychology

== Books ==
- Helms, J.E. (1982). A practitioners guide to the Edwards Personal Preference Schedule. Springfield, IL: Charles Thomas.
- Helms, J.E. (1991). A Training manual to accompany Black and White Racial Identity. Topeka, KS: Content Communications.
- Helms, J.E. (1992). A Race Is a Nice Thing to Have: A Guide to Being A White Person or Understanding the White Persons in your life. Topeka, KS: Content Communications.
- Helms, J.E., & Cook, D.A. (1999). Using race in counseling and psychotherapy: theory and process. Needham, MA: Allyn & Bacon.
