= White privilege =

Societal privilege based on skin lightness

White privilege, or white skin privilege, is the societal privilege that benefits white people in some societies, relative to non-white people under the same social, political, or economic circumstances. With roots in European colonialism and imperialism, and the Atlantic slave trade, white privilege has developed in circumstances that have broadly sought to protect white racial privileges, various national citizenships, and other rights or special benefits.

In the study of white privilege and its broader field of whiteness studies, both pioneered in the United States, academic perspectives such as critical race theory use the concept to analyze how racism and racialized societies affect the lives of white or white-skinned people. For example, American academic Peggy McIntosh described the advantages that whites in Western societies enjoy and non-whites do not experience as "an invisible package of unearned assets". White privilege denotes both obvious and less obvious passive advantages that white people may not recognize they have, which distinguishes it from overt bias or prejudice. These include cultural affirmations of one's own worth; presumed greater social status; and freedom to move, buy, work, play, and speak freely. The effects can be seen in professional, educational, and personal contexts. The concept of white privilege also implies the right to assume the universality of one's own experiences, marking others as different or exceptional while perceiving oneself as normal.

Some scholars say that the term uses the concept of "whiteness" as a substitute for class or other social privilege or as a distraction from deeper underlying problems of inequality. Others state that it is not that whiteness is a substitute but that many other social privileges are interconnected with it, requiring complex and careful analysis to identify how whiteness contributes to privilege. Other commentators propose alternative definitions of whiteness and exceptions to or limits of white identity, arguing that the concept of white privilege ignores important differences between white subpopulations and individuals and suggesting that the notion of whiteness cannot be inclusive of all white people. They note the problem of acknowledging the diversity of people of color and ethnicity within these groups.

Some commentators have observed that the "academic-sounding concept of white privilege" sometimes elicits defensiveness and misunderstanding among white people, in part due to how the concept of white privilege was rapidly brought into the mainstream spotlight through social media campaigns such as Black Lives Matter. As an academic concept that was only recently brought into the mainstream, the concept of white privilege is frequently misinterpreted by non-academics; some academics, having studied white privilege undisturbed for decades, have been surprised by the recent opposition from right-wing critics since approximately 2014. The academic concept has been described as essentialist.

== Definition ==
White privilege is a collection of social advantages that are afforded to white people regardless of their socioeconomic class in societies marked by racial disparities.

According to the American Anthropological Association, the general public has been conditioned to view different human 'races' as true separate divisions of the human species, contrary to genetic evidence which clearly shows that all human 'races' are closely genetically related. The mistaken belief that race is real has led to the assignment of some groups (such as Black people) as inferior, while permitting unfair access to privilege, power, and wealth for others (such as White people).

White privilege studies seek to explain how racism gives advantages to white people. As such, most definitions and discussions of the concept use as a starting point McIntosh's metaphor of the "invisible backpack" that white people unconsciously "wear" in a society where racism is prevalent.

== History ==
=== European colonialism ===
European colonialism, involving some of the earliest significant contacts of Europeans with indigenous peoples, was crucial in the foundation and development of white privilege. Academics, such as Charles V. Hamilton, have explored how European colonialism and slavery in the early modern period, including the transatlantic slave trade and Europe's colonization of the Americas, began a centuries-long progression of white privilege and non-white subjugation. Sociologist Bob Blauner has proposed that this era of European colonialism and slavery was the height, or most extreme version, of white privilege in recorded history.

William Miller Macmillan suggests that the Great Trek was an attempt to preserve the racial privilege of White South Africans. Anti-slavery policies were seen as a threat by the Dutch-speaking settlers, who were afraid of losing their African and Asian slaves and their superior status as people of European descent. Contemporary news reports made similar observations.

=== Early 20th-century ===
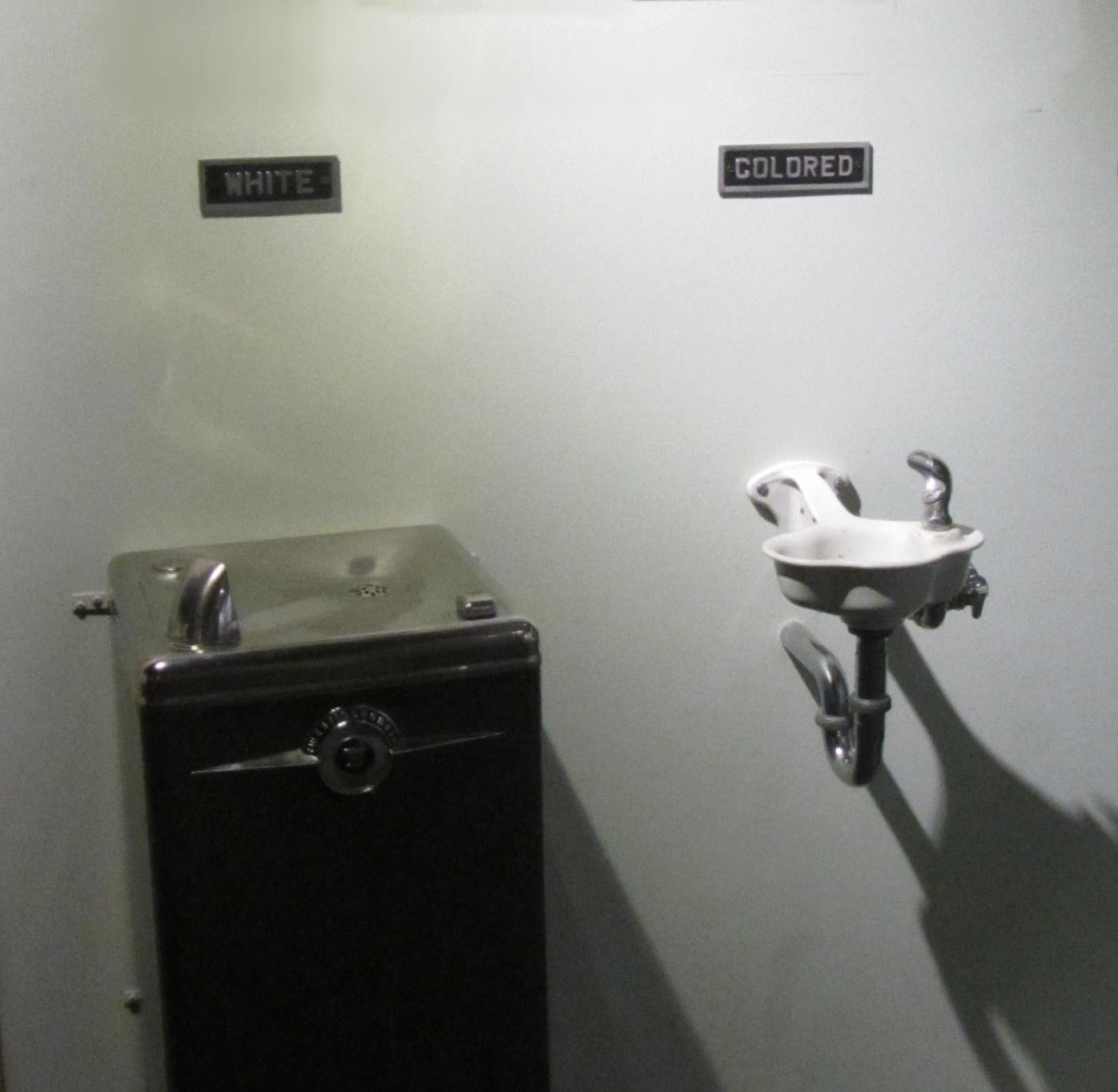
Segregation in the Jim Crow South mandated the use of different drinking fountains for Black Americans.

An address on Social Equities, from a 1910 National Council of the Congregational Churches of the United States publication, demonstrates some of the earliest terminology developing in the concept of white skin privilege:

What infinite cruelties and injustices have been practiced by men who believed that to have a white skin constituted special privilege and who reckoned along with the divine rights of kings the divine rights of the white! We are all glad to take up the white man's burden if that burden carries with it the privilege of asserting the white man's superiority, of exploiting the man of lesser breed, and making him know and keep his place.

In his 1935 Black Reconstruction in America, W. E. B. Du Bois introduced the concept of a "psychological wage" for white laborers. He wrote that this special status divided the labor movement by leading low-wage white workers to feel superior to low-wage black workers. Du Bois identified white supremacy as a global phenomenon affecting the social conditions across the world through colonialism. For instance, Du Bois wrote:

It must be remembered that the white group of laborers, while they received a low wage, were compensated in part by a sort of public and psychological wage. They were given public deference and titles of courtesy because they were white. They were admitted freely with all classes of white people to public functions, public parks, and the best schools. The police were drawn from their ranks, and the courts, dependent on their votes, treated them with such leniency as to encourage lawlessness. Their vote selected public officials, and while this had small effect upon the economic situation, it had great effect upon their personal treatment and the deference shown them. White schoolhouses were the best in the community, and conspicuously placed, and they cost anywhere from twice to ten times as much per capita as the colored schools. The newspapers specialized on news that flattered the poor whites and almost utterly ignored the Negro except in crime and ridicule.

In a 1942 edition of Modern Review magazine, Ramananda Chatterjee accused Winston Churchill of hypocritical policy positions, in his support, as Chatterjee viewed it, of racial equality in the UK and US but not in British India; "Mr Churchill can support white privilege and monopoly in India whilst opposing privilege and monopoly on both sides of the Atlantic." In 1943, during World War II, sociologist Alfred McClung Lee's Race Riot, Detroit 1943 addressed the "Nazi-like guarantee of white privilege" in American society:

White Americans might well ask themselves: Why do whites need so many special advantages in their competition with Negroes? Similar tactics for the elimination of Jewish competition in Nazi Germany brought the shocked condemnation of the civilized world.

=== Late 20th-century ===
The concept of white privilege came to be used within radical circles for self-criticism by anti-racist whites.

In the 1960s, Theodore W. Allen urged White Americans to renounce their "white skin privileges". In the same era, the Students for a Democratic Society called "for an all-out fight against 'white skin privileges'".

Allen extended his analysis of white privilege to the colonial period. Allen maintained several points: namely that the concept of a "white race" was invented as an element of social control. Central to this process was the conferring of privileges to White working people that were against the interests of Black people and other minorities. Allen also argues that this privilege is the main retardant of working-class consciousness in the US.

In the 1980s, Peggy McIntosh developed one of the earliest theoretical concepts of white privilege. Her early work is still routinely cited as a key influence by later generations of academics and journalists.

In the same time period, the American feminist movement was criticized for exhibiting "class privilege" and "white privilege". In later years, the theory of intersectionality also gained prominence.

By 2003, most scholars of race relations had embraced the concept white privilege. The same year, sociologists in the American Mosaic Project at the University of Minnesota reported that in the United States there was a widespread belief that white privilege was real. According to their poll, white privilege was affirmed by 59% of white respondents, 83% of Blacks, and 84% of Hispanics.

=== 21st-century ===
The concept of white privilege marked its transition from academia to more mainstream prominence through social media in the early 2010s, especially in 2014, a year in which Black Lives Matter formed into a major movement and the word "hashtag" itself was added to Merriam-Webster. Brandt and Kizer, in their article "From Street to Tweet" (2015), discuss the American public's perception of the concept of privilege in mainstream culture, including white privilege, as being influenced by social media.

Hua Hsu, a Vassar College professor of English, opens his New Yorker review of the 2015 MTV film White People by suggesting that white people have become aware of their privilege. Hsu ascribes this to generational change, which he considers a byproduct of the "Obama era".

The documentary White People, produced by Jose Antonio Vargas, follows a variety of white teenagers who express their thoughts and feelings about white privilege on-camera. Vargas interviews a white community college student, Katy, who attributes her inability to land a college scholarship to reverse racism against white people; then Vargas points out that white students are "40 percent more likely to receive merit-based funding".

In January 2016, hip-hop group Macklemore and Ryan Lewis released "White Privilege II", a single from their album This Unruly Mess I've Made, in which Macklemore raps that he and other white performers have profited immensely from cultural appropriation of black culture, such as Iggy Azalea.

According to Fredrik deBoer, it is a popular trend for white people to willingly claim self-acknowledgement of their white privilege online. deBoer criticized this practice as promoting self-regard and not solving any actual inequalities. Michael J. Monahana argues that the rhetoric of privilege "obscures as much as it illuminates" and that we "would be better served by beginning with a more sophisticated understanding of racist oppression as systemic, and of individual agents as constitutively implicated in that system."

The theory of white adjacency posits that some groups of non-White people are more closely aligned with White people than others, which affords them some degree of white privilege.

== Application in the education system ==
White privilege as a concept has been influential in multicultural education, teacher training, ethnic and gender studies, sociology, psychology, political science, American studies, and social work education.

=== White defensiveness ===
White students are sometimes resistant to the idea of white privilege, a phenomenon known as white defensiveness.

One report noted that white students often react to in-class discussions about white privilege with a continuum of behaviors ranging from outright hostility to a "wall of silence". A pair of studies on a broader population by Branscombe et al. found that framing racial issues in terms of white privilege as opposed to non-white disadvantages can produce a greater degree of racially biased responses from whites who have higher levels of racial identification. Branscombe et al. demonstrate that framing racial inequality in terms of the privileges of whites increased levels of white guilt among white respondents. Those with high racial identification were more likely to give responses which concurred with modern racist attitudes than those with low racial identification. According to the studies' authors, these findings suggest that representing inequality in terms of outgroup disadvantage allows privileged group members to avoid the negative implications of inequality.

A 2019 study found that reading about white privilege did not change social liberals' sympathy for a poor Black person and reduced their sympathy for a poor white person, whom they were more likely to blame for his situation. One of the study's authors said that this demonstrates the importance of recognizing individual differences when teaching about white privilege.

According to Robin DiAngelo, when white privilege is challenged, the resulting racial stress can trigger a range of defensive responses. For example, some white people, when confronted with racial issues concerning white privilege, may respond with dismissal, distress, or other defensive responses because they may feel personally implicated in white supremacy. DiAngelo also writes that white privilege is very rarely discussed, and often defines race as something that only concerns blacks, excluding other minorities. DiAngelo argues that white defensiveness is not irrational, but rather is often driven by subconscious, sometimes even well-meaning, attitudes toward racism. DiAngelo's book has been criticized for being "self-fulfilling" and "oversimplified".

White backlash has been described as a possible response to the societal examination of white privilege, or to the perceived actual or hypothetical loss of that racial privilege. One study suggests that backlash results from threats to white privilege. George Yancy likewise suggests that the backlash is an extreme response to loss of privilege.

== Global perspectives ==
White privilege functions differently in different places. A person's white skin will not be an asset to them in every conceivable place or situation. White people are also a global minority, and this fact affects the experiences they have outside of their home areas. Nevertheless, some people who use the term "white privilege" describe it as a worldwide phenomenon, resulting from the history of colonialism by white Western Europeans. One author states that American white men are privileged almost everywhere in the world, even though many countries have never been colonized by Western Europeans.

In some accounts, global white privilege is related to American exceptionalism and hegemony.

== By country ==
=== Africa ===
==== Namibia ====
The apartheid system in Namibia created the legal environment for establishing and maintaining white privilege. The segregation of peoples both preserved racial privileges and hindered unitary nation building. In the period of years during the negotiation of Namibian independence, the country's administration, which was dominated by white Namibians, held control of power. In a 1981 NYT analysis, Joseph Lelyveld reported how measures which would challenge white privilege in the country were disregarded, and how politicians, such as Dirk Mudge, ignoring the policy of racial privilege, faced electoral threats from the black majority. In 1988, two years before the country's independence, Frene Ginwala suggested that there was a general refusal to acknowledge the oppression of black women in the country, by the white women who, according to Ginwala, had enjoyed the white privilege of apartheid.

Research conducted by the Journal of Southern African Studies in 2008 has investigated how white privilege is generationally passed on, with particular focus on the descendants of German Namibians, who arrived in the 1950s and 1960s. In 2010, the Journal of Ethnic and Migration Studies further analyzed white privilege in post-colonial Namibia.

==== South Africa ====
White privilege was legally enshrined in South Africa through apartheid. Apartheid was institutionalized in 1948 and lasted formally into the early 1990s. Under apartheid, racial privilege was not only socially meaningful—it became bureaucratically regulated. Laws such as the 1950 Population Registration Act established criteria to officially classify South Africans by race: White, Indian, Colored (mixed), or Black.

Many scholars say that 'whiteness' still corresponds to a set of social advantages in South Africa, and conventionally refer to these advantages as "white privilege". The system of white privilege applies both to the way a person is treated by others and to a set of behaviors, affects, and thoughts, which can be learned and reinforced. These elements of "whiteness" establish social status and guarantee advantages for some people, without directly relying on skin color or other aspects of a person's appearance. White privilege in South Africa has small-scale effects, such as preferential treatment for people who appear white in public, and large-scale effects, such as the over five-fold difference in average per-capita income for people identified as white or black.

"Afrikaner whiteness" has also been described as a partially subordinate identity, relative to the British Empire and Boerehaat (a type of prejudice towards Afrikaners), "disgraced" further by the end of apartheid. Some fear that white South Africans suffer from "reverse racism" at the hands of the country's newly empowered majority, "Unfair" racial discrimination is prohibited by Section Nine of the Constitution of South Africa, and this section also allows for laws to be made to address "unfair discrimination". "Fair discrimination" is tolerated by subsection 5.

=== Asia ===
==== Japan ====
According to Japanese sociologist Itsuko Kamoro in 2008, White men represent the "apex" of romantic desirability to young Japanese women. Many authors have described a widespread fetishization of White men by Japanese women, and cultural factors within Japan give white males a kind of 'gendered white privilege' that enables them to easily find a romantic partner. When Japan was richer in the early 2000s, many Japanese women were even willing to consider a White man who earns less money than them for marriage. This reflected the hegemonic masculinity of white men in Japan. The same desirability is not given to White women within Japan, who are stereotyped as "mannish" or "loud", and therefore undesirable by Japanese men.

White English speakers are privileged in their ability to gain employment teaching English at Eikaiwa schools in Japan, regardless of Japanese language skills or professional qualifications.

==== South Korea ====
White privilege has been analyzed in South Korea, and has been discussed as pervasive in Korean society. White residents, and tourists to the country, have been observed to be given special treatment, and, in particular, white Americans have been, at times, culturally venerated.

Professor Helene K. Lee has noted that possessing mixed white and Korean heritage, or, specifically, its physical appearance, can afford a biracial individual white privilege in the country. In 2009, writer Jane Jeong Trenka wrote that, as an adoptee to a white family from the United States, it was easier for her to recognize its function in Korean culture.

The culture of US military camptowns in South Korea (a remnant of the Korean War) have been studied as a setting for white privilege, and an exacerbation of racial divides between white American and African American soldiers located on bases, as well as with local Korean people.

=== North America ===
==== Canada ====
In 2014, the Elementary Teachers' Federation of Ontario received media coverage when it publicly advertised a workshop for educators about methods of teaching white privilege to students. "White Privilege: Unpacking the Invisible Knapsack" had become one of its most recommended teaching tools. During the 2014 Toronto mayoral election, then-candidate John Tory, asked in a debate whether white privilege exists, answered "No, I don't know that it does."

In 2019, the Canadian Federation for the Humanities and Social Sciences suspended a man from attending their annual meeting for three years for racially profiling a black Canadian scholar. The federation stated that it required the offender to demonstrate that he had taken measures to increase his awareness of white privilege before he would be allowed to attend any future congress.

Later in the year, a former First Nations in Manitoba grand chief stated how many indigenous Canadians perceived the court system of Canada to discriminate against them under the structure of white skin privilege. Journalist Gary Mason has suggested that the phenomenon is embedded within the culture of fraternities and sororities in Canada.

==== United States ====
Some scholars attribute white privilege, which they describe as informal racism, to the formal racism (i.e. slavery followed by Jim Crow) that existed for much of American history. In her book Privilege Revealed: How Invisible Preference Undermines America, Stephanie M. Wildman writes that many Americans who advocate a merit-based, race-free worldview do not acknowledge the systems of privilege which have benefited them. For example, many Americans rely on a social or financial inheritance from previous generations, an inheritance unlikely to be forthcoming if one's ancestors were slaves. Whites were sometimes afforded opportunities and benefits that were unavailable to others. In the middle of the 20th century, the government subsidized white homeownership through the Federal Housing Administration, but not homeownership by minorities. Some social scientists also suggest that the historical processes of suburbanization and decentralization are instances of white privilege that have contributed to contemporary patterns of environmental racism.

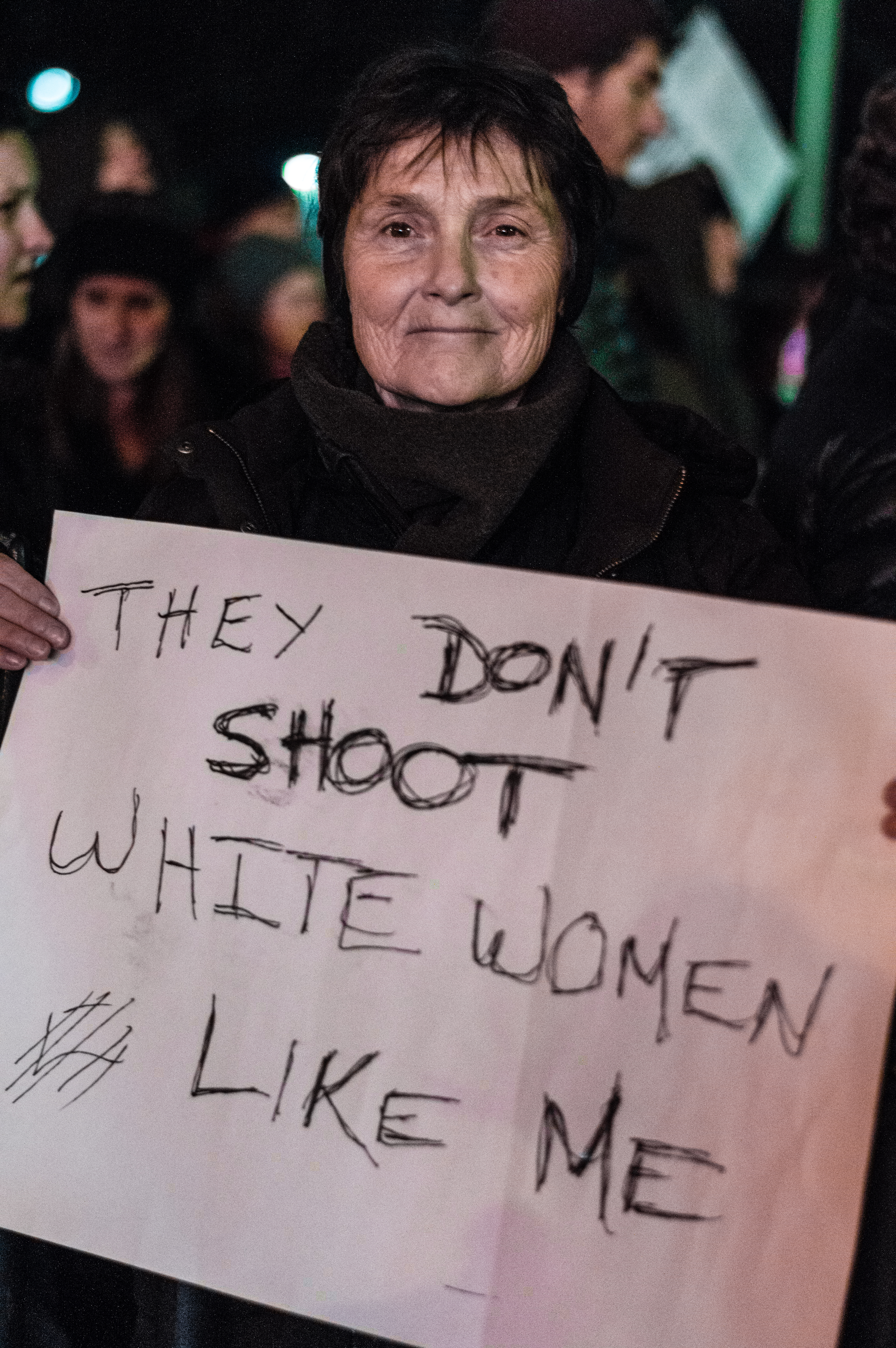
A protester holds a sign at a Black Lives Matter protest.

In Blum's analysis of the underlying structure of white privilege, "spared injustice" is when a person of color suffers an unjust treatment while a white person does not. His example of this is when "a Black person is stopped by the police without due cause but a White person is not". He identifies "unjust enrichment" privileges as those for which whites are spared the injustice of a situation, and in turn, are benefiting from the injustice of others. For instance, "if police are too focused on looking for Black lawbreakers, they might be less vigilant toward White ones, conferring an unjust enrichment benefit on Whites who do break the laws but escape detection for this reason."

Blum describes "non-injustice-related" privileges as those which are not associated with injustices experienced by people of color, but relate to a majority group's advantages over a minority group. Those who are in the majority, usually white people, gain "unearned privileges not founded on injustice." According to Blum, in workplace cultures there tends to be a partly ethnocultural character, so that some ethnic or racial groups' members find them more comfortable than do others.

===== Wealth =====
According to Roderick Harrison "wealth is a measure of cumulative advantage or disadvantage" and "the fact that black and Hispanic wealth is a fraction of white wealth also reflects a history of discrimination". Whites have historically had more opportunities to accumulate wealth. Some of the institutions of wealth creation amongst American citizens were open exclusively to whites. Similar differentials applied to the Social Security Act (which excluded agricultural and domestic workers, sectors that then included most black workers), rewards to military officers, and the educational benefits offered to returning soldiers after World War II. An analyst of the phenomenon, Thomas Shapiro, professor of law and social policy at Brandeis University, says, "The wealth gap is not just a story of merit and achievement, it's also a story of the historical legacy of race in the United States."

Over the past 40 years, there has been less formal discrimination in America; the inequality in wealth between racial groups however, is still extant. George Lipsitz asserts that because wealthy whites were able to pass along their wealth in the form of inheritances and transformative assets (inherited wealth which lifts a family beyond their own achievements), white Americans on average continually accrue advantages. Pre-existing disparities in wealth are exacerbated by tax policies that reward investment over waged income, subsidize mortgages, and subsidize private sector developers.

Thomas Shapiro wrote that wealth is passed along from generation to generation, giving whites a better "starting point" in life than other races. According to Shapiro, many whites receive financial assistance from their parents allowing them to live beyond their income. This, in turn, enables them to buy houses and major assets which aid in the accumulation of wealth. Since houses in white neighborhoods appreciate faster, even African Americans who are able to overcome their "starting point" are unlikely to accumulate wealth as fast as whites. Shapiro asserts this is a continual cycle from which whites consistently benefit. These benefits also have effects on schooling and other life opportunities.

===== Employment and economics =====
Median weekly earnings of full-time wage and salary workers, by sex, race, and ethnicity, U.S., 2009

Racialized employment networks can benefit whites at the expense of non-white minorities. Asian-Americans, for example, although lauded as a "model minority", rarely rise to positions high in the workplace: only 8 of the Fortune 500 companies have Asian-American CEOs, making up 1.6% of CEO positions while Asian-Americans are 4.8% of the population. In a study published in 2003, sociologist Deirdre A. Royster compared black and white males who graduated from the same school with the same skills. In looking at their success with school-to-work transition and working experiences, she found that white graduates were more often employed in skilled trades, earned more, held higher status positions, received more promotions and experienced shorter periods of unemployment. Since all other factors were similar, the differences in employment experiences were attributed to race. Royster concluded that the primary cause of these racial differences was due to social networking. The concept of "who you know" seemed just as important to these graduates as "what you know".

According to the distinctiveness theory, posited by University of Kentucky professor Ajay Mehra and colleagues, people identify with other people who share similar characteristics which are otherwise rare in their environment; women identify more with women, whites with other whites. Because of this, Mehra finds that white males tend to be highly central in their social networks due to their numbers. Royster says that this assistance, disproportionately available to whites, is an advantage that often puts black men at a disadvantage in the employment sector. According to Royster, "these ideologies provide a contemporary deathblow to working-class black men's chances of establishing a foothold in the traditional trades."

Other research shows that there is a correlation between a person's name and their likelihood of receiving a call back for a job interview. Marianne Bertrand and Sendhil Mullainathan found in field experiment in Boston and Chicago that people with "white-sounding" names are 50% more likely to receive a call back than people with "black-sounding" names, despite equal résumé quality between the two racial groups. White Americans are more likely than black Americans to have their business loan applications approved, even when other factors such as credit records are comparable.

Black and Latino college graduates are less likely than white graduates to end up in a management position even when other factors such as age, experience, and academic records are similar.

Cheryl Harris relates whiteness to the idea of "racialized privilege" in the article "Whiteness as Property": she describes it as "a type of status in which white racial identity provided the basis for allocating societal benefits both private and public and character".

Daniel A. Farber and Suzanne Sherry argue that the proportion of Jews and Asians who are successful relative to the white male population poses an intractable puzzle for proponents of what they call "radical multiculturism", who they say overemphasize the role of sex and race in American society.

===== Housing =====
Discrimination in housing policies was formalized in 1934 under the Federal Housing Act which provided government credit to private lending for home buyers. Within the Act, the Federal Housing Agency had the authority to channel all the money to white home buyers instead of minorities. The FHA also channeled money away from inner-city neighborhoods after World War II and instead placed it in the hands of white home buyers who would move into segregated suburbs. These, and other, practices intensified attitudes of segregation and inequality.

The "single greatest source of wealth" for white Americans is the growth in value in their owner-occupied homes. The family wealth so generated is the most important contribution to wealth disparity between black and white Americans. It has been said that continuing discrimination in the mortgage industry perpetuates this inequality, not only for black homeowners who pay higher mortgage rates than their white counterparts, but also for those excluded entirely from the housing market by these factors, who are thus excluded from the financial benefits of both capital appreciation and the tax deductions associated with home ownership.

Brown, Carnoey and Oppenheimer, in "Whitewashing Race: The Myth of a Color-Blind Society", write that the financial inequities created by discriminatory housing practices also have an ongoing effect on young black families, since the net worth of one's parents is the best predictor of one's own net worth, so discriminatory financial policies of the past contribute to race-correlated financial inequities of today. For instance, it is said that even when income is controlled for, whites have significantly more wealth than blacks, and that this present fact is partially attributable to past federal financial policies that favored whites over blacks.

===== Education =====
Academic and societal ideas about race have tended to focus solely on the disadvantages suffered by racial minorities, overlooking the advantageous effects that accrue to whites.

According to Stephanie Wildman and Ruth Olson, education policies in the US have contributed to the construction and reinforcement of white privilege. Wildman says that even schools that appear to be integrated often segregate students based on abilities. This can increase white students' initial educational advantage, magnifying the "unequal classroom experience of African American students" and minorities.

Williams and Rivers (1972b) showed that test instructions in Standard English disadvantaged the black child and that if the language of the test is put in familiar labels without training or coaching, the child's performances on the tests increase significantly. According to Cadzen a child's language development should be evaluated in terms of his progress toward the norms for his particular speech community. Other studies using sentence repetition tasks found that, at both third and fifth grades, white subjects repeated Standard English sentences significantly more accurately than black subjects, while black subjects repeated nonstandard English sentences significantly more accurately than white subjects.

According to Janet E. Helms traditional psychological and academic assessment is based on skills that are considered important within white, western, middle-class culture, but which may not be salient or valued within African-American culture. When tests' stimuli are more culturally pertinent to the experiences of African Americans, performance improves. Critics of the concept of white privilege say that in K–12 education, students' academic progress is measured on nationwide standardized tests which reflect national standards.

African Americans are disproportionately sent to special education classes in their schools, and identified as being disruptive or suffering from a learning disability. These students are segregated for the majority of the school day, taught by uncertified teachers, and do not receive high school diplomas. Wanda Blanchett has said that white students have consistently privileged interactions with the special education system, which provides 'non-normal' whites with the resources they need to benefit from the mainline white educational structure.

The United States housing market has historically discriminated against Black Americans, through practices such as redlining. Because home ownership is one of the lucrative sources of wealth in America, with home values appreciating at an extraordinary rate since the 1990s, this has effectively denied a massive source of generational wealth to a significant number of Black Americans, which has profound implications beyond personal wealth alone; it also affects the quality of Black neighborhoods and Black schools. The vast majority of schools placed on academic probation as part of district accountability efforts are majority African-American, and low-income.

Inequalities in wealth and housing allow a higher proportion of white parents the option to move to better school districts or afford to put their children in private schools if they do not approve of the neighborhood's schools.

According to Lawrence Blum:

When Blacks are denied access to desirable homes, for example, this is not just an injustice to Blacks but a positive benefit to Whites who now have a wider range of domicile options than they would have if Blacks had equal access to housing. When urban schools do a poor job of educating their Latino/a and Black students, this benefits Whites in the sense that it unjustly advantages them in the competition for higher levels of education and jobs. Whites in general cannot avoid benefiting from the historical legacy of racial discrimination and oppression. So unjust enrichment is almost never absent from the life situation of Whites.

Some studies have claimed that minority students are less likely to be placed in honors classes, even when justified by test scores. Various studies have also claimed that visible minority students are more likely than white students to be suspended or expelled from school, even though rates of serious school rule violations do not differ significantly by race. Adult education specialist Elaine Manglitz says the educational system in America has deeply entrenched biases in favor of the white majority in evaluation, curricula, and power relations.

In discussing unequal test scores between public school students, opinion columnist Matt Rosenberg laments the Seattle Public Schools' emphasis on "institutional racism" and "white privilege":

The disparity is not simply a matter of color: School District data indicate income, English-language proficiency and home stability are also important correlates to achievement ... By promoting the "white privilege" canard and by designing a student indoctrination plan, the Seattle School District is putting retrograde, leftist politics ahead of academics, while the perpetrators of "white privilege" are minimizing the capabilities of minorities.

Conservative author Shelby Steele believes that the effects of white privilege are exaggerated, saying that blacks may incorrectly blame their personal failures on white oppression, and that there are many "minority privileges": "If I'm a black high school student today ... there are white American institutions, universities, hovering over me to offer me opportunities: Almost every institution has a diversity committee ... There is a hunger in this society to do right racially, to not be racist."

Anthony P. Carnevale and Jeff Strohl show that whites have a better opportunity at getting into selective schools, while African Americans and Hispanics usually end up going to open access schools and have a lower chance of receiving a bachelor's degree. A 2019 National Bureau of Economic Research working paper found that over 43% of white students admitted to Harvard University were recruited athletes, children of alumni, on the dean's interest list, or children of faculty and staff, compared with under 16% of African American, Asian American and Hispanic admits. A writer in The Guardian described this as white privilege in the admissions process.

===== Military =====
In a 2013 news story, Fox News reported, "A controversial 600-plus page manual used by the military to train its Equal Opportunity officers teaches that 'healthy, white, heterosexual, Christian' men hold an unfair advantage over other races, and warns in great detail about a so-called 'White Male Club.' ... The manual, which was obtained by Fox News, also instructs troops to 'support the leadership of non-white people. Do this consistently, but not uncritically,' the manual states." The manual was prepared by the Defense Equal Opportunity Management Institute, which is an official unit of the Department of Defense under the control of the Secretary of Defense.

=== Oceania ===
==== Australia ====
Indigenous Australians were historically excluded from the process that lead to the federation of Australia, and the White Australia policy restricted the freedoms for non-white people, particularly with respect to immigration. Indigenous people were governed by the Aborigines Protection Board and treated as a separate underclass of non-citizens. Prior to a referendum conducted in 1967, it was unconstitutional for Indigenous Australians to be counted in population statistics.

Holly Randell-Moon has said that news media are geared towards white people and their interests and that this is an example of white privilege. Michele Lobo claims that white neighborhoods are normally identified as "good quality", while "ethnic" neighborhoods may become stigmatized, degraded, and neglected.

Some scholars claim white people are seen presumptively as "Australian", and as prototypical citizens. Catherine Koerner has claimed that a major part of white Australian privilege is the ability to be in Australia itself, and that this is reinforced by, discourses on non-white outsiders including asylum seekers and undocumented immigrants.

Some scholars have suggested that public displays of multiculturalism, such as the celebration of artwork and stories of Indigenous Australians, amount to tokenism, since indigenous Australians voices are largely excluded from the cultural discourse surrounding the history of colonialism and the narrative of European colonizers as peaceful settlers. These scholars suggest that white privilege in Australia, like white privilege elsewhere, involves the ability to define the limits of what can be included in a "multicultural" society. Indigenous studies in Australian universities remains largely controlled by white people, hires many white professors, and does not always embrace political changes that benefit indigenous people. Scholars also say that prevailing modes of Western epistemology and pedagogy, associated with the dominant white culture, are treated as universal while Indigenous perspectives are excluded or treated only as objects of study. One Australian university professor reports that white students may perceive indigenous academics as beneficiaries of reverse racism.

Some scholars have claimed that for Australian whites, another aspect of privilege is the ability to identify with a global diaspora of other white people in the United States, Europe, and elsewhere. This privilege contrasts with the separation of Indigenous Australians from other indigenous peoples in southeast Asia. They also claim that global political issues such as climate change are framed in terms of white actors and effects on countries that are predominantly white.

White privilege varies across places and situations. Ray Minniecon, director of Crossroads Aboriginal Ministries, described the city of Sydney specifically as "the most alien and inhospitable place of all to Aboriginal culture and people". At the other end of the spectrum, anti-racist white Australians working with Indigenous people may experience their privilege as painful "stigma".

Studies of white privilege in Australia have increased since the late 1990s, with several books published on the history of how whiteness became a dominant identity. Aileen Moreton-Robinson's Talkin' Up to the White Woman is a critique of unexamined white privilege in the Australian feminist movement. The Australian Critical Race and Whiteness Studies Association formed in 2005 to study racial privilege and promote respect for Indigenous sovereignties; it publishes an online journal called Critical Race and Whiteness Studies.

==== New Zealand ====
In New Zealand, a localized relationship to the concept, frequently termed Pākehā privilege, due to the legacy of the colonizing European settlers, has developed.

Academic Huia Jahnke's book Mana Tangata: Politics of Empowerment explored how European New Zealanders, in rejecting the 'one people' national narrative and embracing the label Pākehā ("foreigner"), has allowed space to examine white privilege and the societal marginalization of Māori people. Similarly, Massey University scholar Malcolm Mulholland argued that "studying inequalities between Māori and non-Māori outcomes allows us to identify Pākehā privilege and name it."

In their book Healing Our History, Robert and Joanna Consedine argued that in the colonial era Pākehā privilege was enforced in school classrooms by strict time periods, European symbols, and the exclusion of te reo (the Māori language), disadvantaging Māori children and contributing to the suppression of Māori culture.

In 2016, on the 65th anniversary of Māori Women's Welfare League, the League's president criticized the "dominant Pakeha culture" in New Zealand, and embedded Pākehā privilege.

== See also ==
- Angry white male
- Bumiputera (Malaysia)
- Chinese privilege
- Ethnic penalty
- First World privilege
- Identity politics
- Racism in Japan
- Kyriarchy
- Media bias
- Missing white woman syndrome
- Social stratification
- White monkey
- Whiteness theory
- Racism against African Americans
- Institutional racism

== Bibliography ==
- Allen, Theodore W. The Invention of the White Race: Racial Oppression and Social Control (Verso, 1994) ISBN 0-86091-660-X.
- Blum, Lawrence. 2008. 'White Privilege': A Mild Critique1. Theory and Research in Education. 6:309. doi:10.1177/1477878508095586.
- Hartigan, John. Odd Tribes: Toward a Cultural Analysis of White People. Duke University Press, 2005. ISBN 978-0-8223-3597-9
- Lipsitz, George. The Possessive Investment in Whiteness: How White People Profit from Identity Politics, Revised and Expanded Edition. Temple University Press, 2006. ISBN 1-56639-635-2.
- Olson, Ruth. White Privilege in Schools. Beyond Heroes and Holidays. 1998. Endid Lee. Teaching for Change, 1998.
- McIntosh, Peggy. "White Privilege: Unpacking the Invisible Knapsack." (excerpt from Working Paper #189, "White Privilege and Male Privilege: A Personal Account of Coming to See Correspondences Through Work in Women's Studies" (1988), Wellesley College Center for Research on Women, Wellesley, Massachusetts.)
- McIntosh, Peggy. "White Privilege: Unpacking the Invisible Knapsack." Beyond Heroes and Holidays. 1998. Endid Lee. Teaching for Change, 1998.
- Williams, Linda Faye (August 30, 2004). The Constraint of Race: Legacies of White Skin Privilege in America. University Park, Pennsylvania: Pennsylvania State University Press. p. 429. ISBN 978-0-271-02535-3.
