= Becoming white thesis =

Theory of American immigrant integration

The becoming white thesis or becoming white narrative is a historical narrative in the United States that certain non-Anglo-Saxon and non-Protestant immigrant groups from Europe and the Middle East including Armenians, Catholics, Greeks, the Irish, Italians, Jews, Arabs, and Slavs were once considered "non-white" (despite them generally having light skin similar to other white people) and later acquired the status of whiteness.

The thesis pertains primarily to the social and economic status of these immigrant groups, rather than their status under law, as all European immigrants between the Naturalization Act of 1790 and 1952 were classified as "free white persons" for the purposes of federal naturalization law, and all European immigrant groups have been listed as white on the federal census from the first census in 1790 to the most recent census in 2020.

An alternative to the becoming white thesis is the white on arrival thesis, which states that all European immigrants were legally white in ways that African Americans, Asian Americans, and Native Americans typically were not.

== Historiography ==
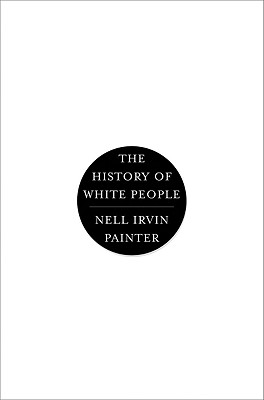
Nell Irvin Painter's 2010 book The History of White People

The becoming white thesis or narrative was popularized in the 1990s by American scholars of European immigration to the United States. The historian Marta Cieslak has written that the "becoming white" thesis has been contrasted with the "white on arrival" thesis since the subject has been debated. Cieslak has stated her view that the becoming white thesis "lingers" in academic and popular discourse and that academics such as the historian Jochen Lingelbach have written books undermining the narrative while still appearing "unable to reject it completely".

In his 1995 book How the Irish Became White, Marxist historian Noel Ignatiev argued that Irish immigrants to the United States overcame anti-Irish and anti-Catholic discrimination from white Americans by adopting their racist and anti-Black attitudes; Ignatiev's core argument in the book was that "whiteness was not a biological fact but rather a social construction with boundaries that shifted over time". The book quickly spread beyond academic circles and achieved widespread mainstream popularity, with the historian Nell Irvin Painter writing in The Washington Post that it was "the most interesting history book of 1995," and a positive review blurb on the book's back cover was provided by the former radio personality Mumia Abu-Jamal, who at the time was on death row for the 1981 murder of Irish-American police officer Daniel Faulkner. How the Irish Became White went on to have a seminal influence in whiteness studies.

Labor historian Eric Arnesen wrote in 2001 that "the notion that the non-white Irish became white has become axiomatic among many academics"; however, he argued that this was historically inaccurate, and that the Irish in the United States were considered white throughout the 19th and 20th centuries. David Roediger has argued that during the early period of Irish immigration to the United States "it was by no means clear that the Irish were white" or "that they would be admitted to all the rights of whites and granted all the privileges of citizenship". However, Arnesen suggests that the Irish were in fact granted full rights and privileges upon naturalization and that early Irish immigrants "often blended unproblematically into American society". Arnesen has written that the question of Irish Americans becoming white is a useful project, but that discussions are often "vague and inexact", concluding that the narrative that the "Irish became white is dead wrong. The Irish...were not considered “non-white,” and hence did not “become white”; they were already white...the very question posed by whiteness scholars is based upon a false premise."

The 2003 collection Are Italians White? has been an influential text within whiteness studies. Roediger offered an interpretation that Italian-Americans were an "in-between people" who inhabited a racially ambiguous status in society and experienced discrimination in the labor market. The historian Thomas A. Guglielmo offered a different interpretation, writing that Italians and other Europeans had always been "white on arrival" and had never seriously been classified as non-white. Guglielmo emphasizes his view that all European immigrants were legally white in ways that non-whites, such as African-Americans, never were.

In his 2004 essay "What's Critical About White Studies", the historian Paul Spickard wrote that the claim that Jews of European descent became white was an example of "Whiteness studies run amok" and both "silly" and "disrespectful" to the historical experience of people of color. Spickard critiques Karen Brodkin's "How Jews Became White Folks" and describes John Gennari's essay "Passing for Italian" as the "ultimate absurdity" of the becoming white genre of studies. If the theme continued, Spickard wrote, academics might write works on "How the Italians Became White, How the Swedes Became White, perhaps even How the English Became White".

In the book 2007 Almost All Aliens, the historians Paul Spickard, Francisco Beltrán, and Laura Hooton argue that Irish and Italian Americans experienced discrimination yet were always white, "contrary to some of the more extreme formulations of some recent scholars". Noting the existence of antisemitism, including antisemitism from the KKK and the Christian right, as well as antisemitic quotas in higher education and exclusion from institutions such as private clubs, these historians write that while Jews of European descent were legally white, this is evidence that "Jews were not quite the same as other Whites in America" and lived at "the nether edge of Whiteness". However, the historians stress that Jews had access to whiteness that people of color did not have access to, that some "mixed socially with the White Gentile elite", and that Jews served as politicians, judges, cabinet members, and founders of major corporations long before people of color did in substantial numbers.

In 2007, the historian Hasia Diner, while she believes Jews were religiously discriminated against, critiqued the becoming white thesis as having become part of a "realm of jargon and buzzword" and that if such terminology "ever had substance" it had come to "lack any meaning". Critiquing the alleged vagueness and lack of empirical evidence within whiteness studies, she recommended the work of Guglielmo for whom "the possibility of obtaining the full rights of citizenship mattered greatly", Russell Kazan's Becoming Old Stock: The Paradox of German American Identity (2004), and Eric Goldstein's The Price of Whiteness: Jews, Race, and American Identity (2006).

The historian Nell Irvin Painter's 2010 book The History of White People explores the history of whiteness in the United States, including the becoming white thesis in regards to Irish, Italian, and Jewish Americans.

In 2017, the Washington Post writer David Bernstein wrote an op-ed titled "Sorry, but the Irish were always ‘white’ (and so were Italians, Jews and so on)", arguing that the becoming white thesis was inaccurate. Bernstein states that the Irish, Italians, Jews, and other immigrant groups "were indeed considered white by law and by custom", noting that these groups were never targeted by Jim Crow laws or laws against interracial marriage.

In 2019, the New York Times editorial board member Brent Staples wrote an op-ed titled "How Italians 'Became' White", arguing that "Darker skinned southern Italians endured the penalties of blackness on both sides of the Atlantic." Staples noted that Italian-Americans were sometimes subjected to violence and discrimination. Although Staples notes that Italian-Americans gained citizenship as "free white persons", they often took working-class jobs that were associated with African-Americans.

In 2016, the academics Philip Q. Yang and Kavitha Koshy wrote that the becoming white thesis has been "taken for granted" as true by many Americans, but argue that the history is more complicated. Yang and Koshy state that they could find "no evidence to support the “becoming white thesis” in terms of change in the official racial classification of non-Anglo-Saxon European immigrant groups such as Irish, Jews, and Italians in the record of social institutions such as U.S. censuses, naturalization laws, and court cases" and that "If “becoming white” did happen to these groups, its real meaning was a change in their social status from a minority group to part of the majority group rather than in racial classification."

The historian Robert Slayton, writing for Jewish Currents in 2017, states his view that American Jews of European descent inhabited a "middle ground" in the early 20th century that was "neither black nor white", but argues that these Jews became white in the post-World War II era by moving up the socioeconomic ladder, moving to the suburbs, and largely assimilating into the white middle class majority.

Academics have debated whether Czech Americans were historically considered white, non-white, or something intermediate. Sociological scholars generally agree that while Eastern and Southern European immigrants, such as Czechs (including Bohemians and Moravians), were socially distinguishable from Northwestern European immigrants such as Norwegians or Swedes, that "no discernible racial boundary existed" that separated Southern and Eastern Europeans from other white people. While some prejudice and discrimination existed against Czechs, Slavs were never classified as non-whites. All mainstream American academics of the 20th century considered Czechs to be white.

In 2011, the scholar Piotr Szpunar critically examined the becoming white thesis in regard to Polish Americans, stating that from the Jamestown Polish craftsmen in the 1600s and onward Polish immigrants came to North America as free white persons and that it is "erroneous" to claim that Polish people have ever been non-white.

In 2023, the sociologists Philip Kasinitz and Mary C. Waters stated in Becoming white or becoming mainstream? that writing about the racialization of "ethnic whites" such as Italians and Jews often emphasizes incidents of violent persecution, such as the 1891 New Orleans lynchings of Italians and the lynching of Leo Frank. Kasinitz and Waters emphasize that such occurrences were "very small" compared to the thousands of African-Americans who were lynched.

In the 21st century, some Italian-Americans and Jewish-Americans of European descent continue to self-identify as non-white.

In the United Kingdom, the whiteness of Roma is frequently questioned.

== Legal aspects of whiteness ==
=== Alien land laws ===
Because US naturalization law from 1790 to 1870 restricted citizenship to free white persons, alien land laws effectively were laws primarily targeting Asians. Alien land laws sought to discourage Asian immigration by limiting the right of Asian immigrants to own land and property. Prior to the passage of the Naturalization Act of 1870 which extended citizenship eligibility to persons of African descent, Black immigrants were impacted by alien land laws, but afterwards alien land laws only targeted Asian immigrants. White immigrants, such as Irish and German immigrants, were not negatively impacted by alien land laws due to their eligibility for citizenship as free white persons.

=== Draft cards ===
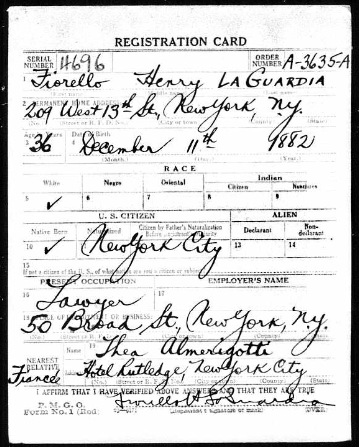
The 1918 draft card of Fiorello La Guardia, the first Italian-American mayor of New York City. His race is listed as white.

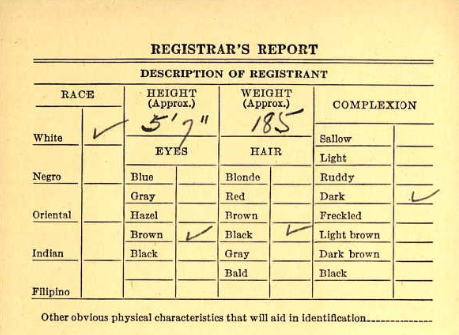
1942 draft card for Amid Abdallah, a Syrian-American from North Dakota. His race is listed as white and his complexion as dark.

During World War I and II, Americans of European descent were listed as "white" on draft cards. During World War I, draft cards for the US military listed four options for race: White, Negro, Oriental, and Indian. The category for American Indians was divided into two sub-categories for citizens and non-citizens. During World War I, Mexican Americans and some Indian Americans were listed as "white" on their draft cards.

During World War II, the US military had five race options for their draft cards: White, Negro, Oriental, (American) Indian, and Filipino.

=== Homestead Acts ===
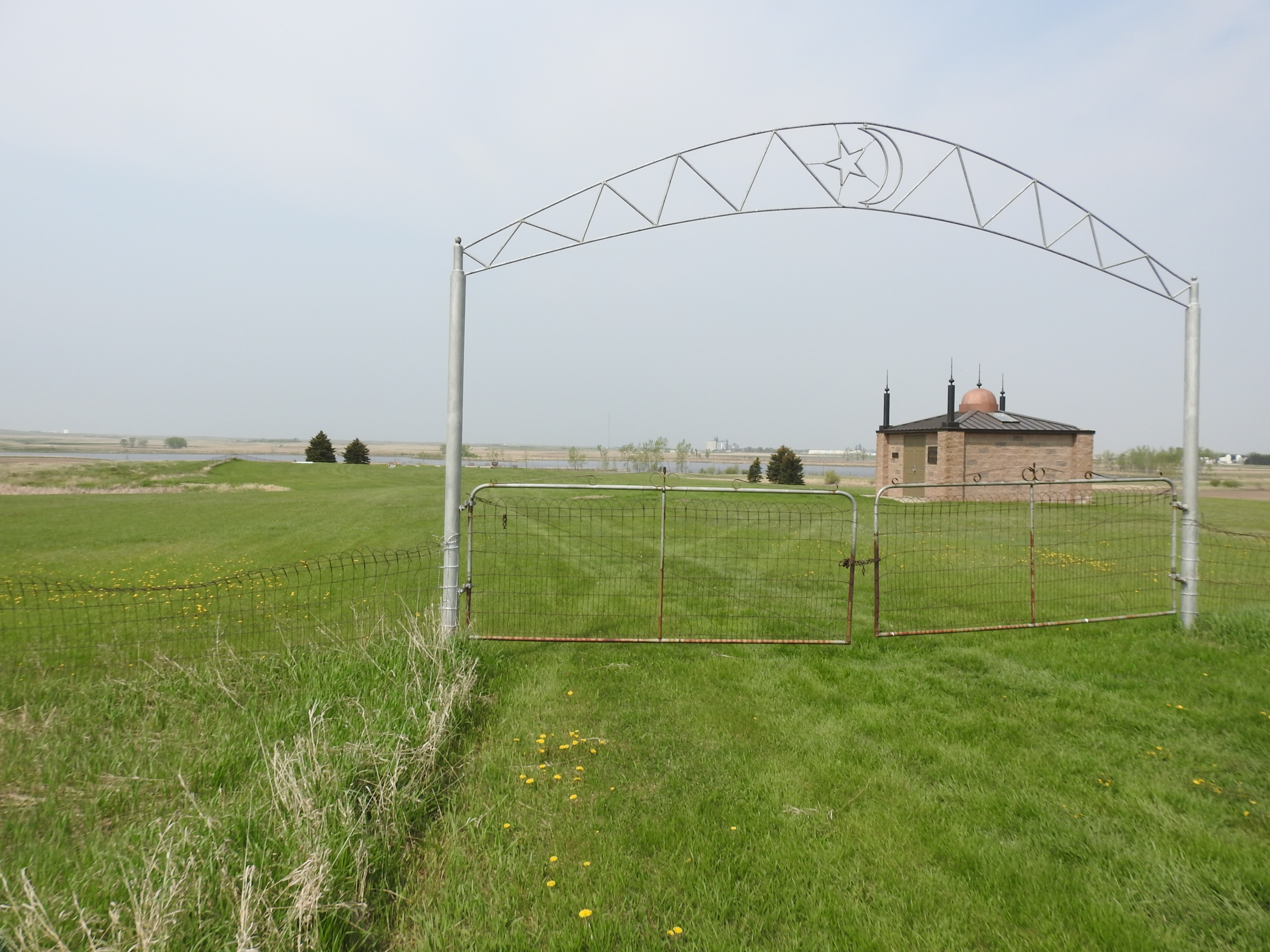
The Assyrian Muslim Cemetery and Mosque founded by Syro-Lebanese Muslim homesteaders in Ross, North Dakota, May 2023

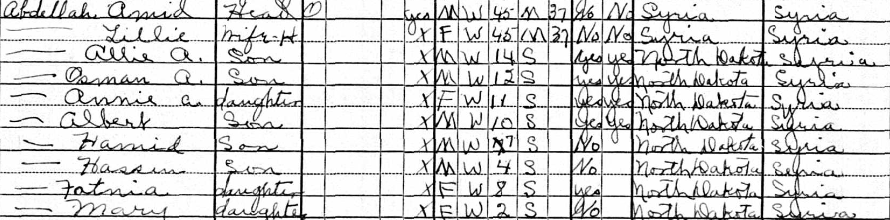
The Syrian-American Abdellah family of North Dakota, listed as "W" for white on the 1930 Census

Joseph Sadeen, a Syrian American from Ross, North Dakota, listed as "W" for white on the 1910 Census

The Homestead Acts had no racial requirement. Native Americans were prohibited from acquiring land unless they renounced their tribal citizenship. A small number of detribalized people claimed land through the Homestead Acts. Due to the lack of a racial requirement, non-Native groups including white, Black, Jewish, and Arab-Muslim Americans were able to acquire Indigenous land through the Homestead Acts. As non-Indians, Black homesteaders escaping racism in the Jim Crow South were able to acquire Indigenous lands in Oklahoma and in the western prairie states. However, recipients of land gained through the Homestead Acts were overwhelmingly white, in large part because only free white persons were allowed to become naturalized citizens. Non-white immigrants who were ineligible for citizenship, such as Asian Americans, did not meet the requirements of the Homestead Acts, which required land recipients to be citizens or eligible intended citizens.

Some historians such as Rebecca Clarren and Ellen Eisenberg have stated their view that some Jewish homesteaders, predominantly German Jews and Russian Jews, participated in white racism and white settler colonialism against Indigenous peoples as pioneers on the western frontier.

The novelist Laila Lalami has written that American Muslims of Syrian and Lebanese descent had a very different process of racialization compared to Black Muslims or Native Americans, noting that some Muslim Americans were able to become citizens as "free white persons" and some Muslim homesteaders gained Indigenous land in the Dakotas through the Homestead Acts.

=== Naturalization law and paperwork ===
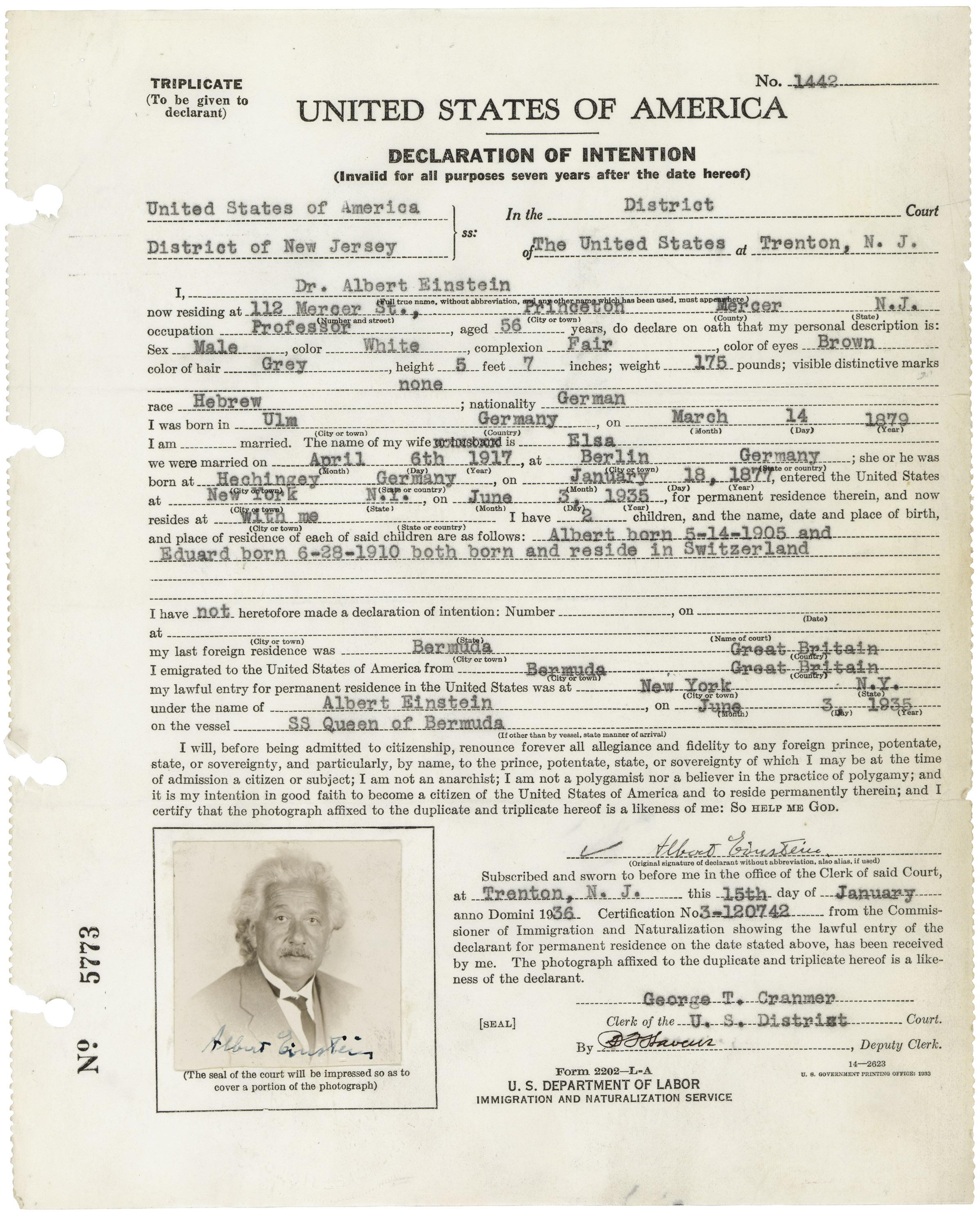
Albert Einstein's 1936 declaration of intent for US citizenship. His color is listed as "White", complexion as "Fair", race as "Hebrew", and nationality as "German".

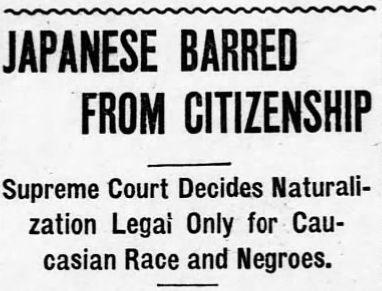
A 1922 news article about the Supreme Court's ruling in Ozawa v. United States that Japanese people are not white

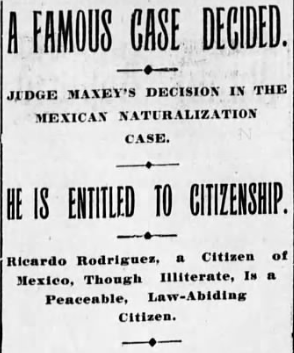
In re Rodriguez, an 1897 Texas court ruling that Mexicans could naturalize as US citizens

During the early period of the United States, at least three states had laws limiting citizenship to "white persons": Virginia in 1779, South Carolina in 1784, and Georgia in 1785.

The federal Naturalization Act of 1790 limited naturalization to "free white persons". During the 18th and 19th century, US politicians were primarily concerned with the legal distinction between "whites", "Blacks" (Africans), and "reds" (American Indians). Because US law restricted naturalization to "free white persons", but did not define which groups counted as "white persons", this created ambiguity for Middle Eastern and Asian immigrants to claim that they were free white persons. The definition of whiteness under law was often contested in court by some Middle Eastern and Asian immigrants who insisted that they counted as white/Caucasian rather than as Black Africans or as "Asiatics"/"Orientals". Between 1878 and 1952 (when race-based restrictions were removed from US naturalization law), fifty-two court cases were brought by non-European immigrants insisting that they be counted as white. Petitions to be counted as white came from Arabs (both Christian and Muslim), Armenians, Burmese people, Chinese people, Indian people, Japanese people, Mexicans, and other immigrants. Middle Eastern people had greater success in court compared to South Asians and East Asians. While some West Asians such as Arabs and Armenians won their court cases, South Asians and East Asians sometimes lost their court cases. Indian Americans had greater success in court compared to East Asians or Southeast Asians; while some courts ruled that Indians were white and other courts ruled that they were non-white, no court ruled in favor of the whiteness of East or Southeast Asians.

The Treaty of Guadalupe Hidalgo extended the choice of U.S. citizenship to Mexicans in the newly purchased territories before many African Americans, Asians, and Native Americans were eligible. If they chose to, they had to declare to the U.S. government within a year of the Treaty being signed; otherwise, they could remain Mexican citizens, but they would have to relocate.

In the 1896 court case In Re Ricardo Rodríguez, the United States District Court for the Western District of Texas ruled that Mexicans were legally white for the purposes of naturalization. As free white persons, Mexican-Americans in Texas had access to voting rights and other rights of white citizens. During the court case Ricardo Rodríguez stated that he was a "pure-blooded Mexican" and did not claim descent from Spaniards or Africans or Indigenous ancestors because he did "not know where they came from". He denied descent from Aztecs or Toltecs and did not identify as an Indian.

American Jews of European descent were legally classified as "free white persons" and thus eligible for citizenship. Jews are not mentioned by the Constitution, the Bill of Rights, or the Naturalization Act of 1790, and the First Amendment protects religious freedom. Because of this, Jews of European descent were always eligible for US citizenship as "free white persons". While antisemitism continued to exist in American society, Jewish immigrants were not prevented from acquiring citizenship due to being Jewish.

During the late 1800s and early 1900s, although all Europeans were listed as white on the federal census, naturalization papers for European immigrants did have a race box. Jewish immigrants were listed as "Hebrew" by race. Other "race" options for immigrants included: African, Armenian, Bohemian, Bulgarian, Cuban, German, Greek, Lithuanian, Moravian, Syrian, Turkish, and other nationalities and ethnicities. Some German-Jewish immigrants to the United States objected to being described as of the "Hebrew race", preferring to list themselves as being of the "German race" on their naturalization paperwork. Some Jewish members of organizations such as the Central Verein der Deutschen Juden and the Union of American Hebrew Congregations (now known as the Union for Reform Judaism) strenuously objected to German Jews being listed as racially Jewish, viewing Jewishness as a religion and preferring that German Jews be allowed to list themselves as racially German.

Although all European immigrants were legally classified as white, some Middle Eastern immigrants had their whiteness contested in court during the early to mid-1900s. In 1915, a federal court ruled in Dow v. United States that a Syrian Christian immigrant could be classified as a "free white person" and was thus eligible for citizenship under US naturalization law. In 1914, during a hearing of the Dow v. United States court case, Judge Henry Smith stated that the term "Jew" was a religious and not a racial distinction. He further stated that European Jews were not separate from other Europeans in any "racial sense" and that European Jews should be considered "racially, physiologically, and psychologically" European. Defending the exclusion of Syrian Jews as non-white, Judge Smith stated that the admission of white European Jews had nothing to do with the exclusion of dark-skinned "African or Asiastic" Jews.

In 1923, the Supreme Court of the United States decided in United States v. Bhagat Singh Thind that a Sikh man from India was not white and therefore not eligible for US citizenship. Thind had argued before the court that he was a high-caste Aryan and thus white and thereby eligible for citizenship.

Armenian Americans went to court twice due to their whiteness being contested, insisting that they be classified as whites rather than as Asians. In In re Halladjian (1909), the United States District Court for the District of Massachusetts ruled that Armenians are legally white for the purposes of naturalization. In United States v. Cartozian, the United States District Court for the District of Oregon also ruled that Armenians are legally white. During the Cartozian court case, the defense team submitted testimony from the leaders of the Loyal Order of the Moose and the Masonic Grand Lodge of Oregon, whites-only organizations that included Armenians.

In the 1922 Ozawa v. United States court case, a Japanese immigrant asserted that Japanese people should be classified as "free white persons". The court ruled against the Japanese immigrant. The Japanese immigrant had made an originalist argument before the court that the "free white persons" clause was originally intended to exclude the only non-white groups that existed in meaningful numbers in the United States in the 1790s - Black Americans and Native Americans - and thus the Founding Fathers did not intend to exclude Asians. The court was not persuaded by the argument, stating that it "is not that Negroes and Indians shall be excluded, but it is, in effect, that only free white persons shall be included."

=== Restrictive covenants ===
Until the passage of the Fair Housing Act of 1968, religiously and racially restrictive covenants were used to keep African-American and other minority groups out of white Christian neighborhoods. Almost all covenants excluded Black Americans, while some excluded other groups as well, such as Jews, Asian-Americans, Syrians, Greeks, or Latinos.

=== Voting rights ===
During the colonial period, some of the Thirteen Colonies instituted religious tests that restricted the ability of Catholics, Jews, Muslims, and others to vote. The Province of Pennsylvania restricted voting to people who believed that Jesus was their Lord and savior, which excluded other religious and non-religious groups, such as atheists, Jews, and Muslims. The Province of New York did not formally prohibit Jews from voting, but Jewish voting rights were sometimes challenged. Georgia, South Carolina, and New Hampshire had laws restricting voting rights to Christians "professing a belief in the faith of any Protestant sect", thereby excluding Catholics, Jews, Muslims, and others. In the 1770s, following the American Revolution, many states softened or removed religious tests from eligibility requirements for voting. New Hampshire was the last state to have a religious test for voting, which removed its Protestant requirement in 1877.

According to the historian Gregory Downs, some Northern states during the 1840s and 1850s implemented modes of voter registration that were designed to decrease the voting participation of Irish-Americans and other immigrant groups. The process was halted by the Civil War, but resumed again in the 1870s during subsequent waves of immigration.

=== Slavery ===
While some white Americans were indentured servants, white Americans were never enslaved. The Irish slaves myth is a commonly repeated pseudohistorical narrative that falsely asserts that Irish-Americans were once enslaved.

According to the historian Laura Arnold Leibman, Jews of European descent were classified as free white persons in the American South during the 19th century and a small number of them enslaved Black people. Leibman contrasts the status of free white Jewish slave owners to the very different status of enslaved Black Jews.

The enslavement of both African Americans and Native Americans was common until the 1700s, but enslaved Africans were the vast majority of enslaved people by the late 1700s. In Virginia, the enslavement of Native Americans faded and was overtaken by the enslavement of African Americans by the year 1800. Court cases in Virginia restricted enslavement to African Americans. In Hudgins v. Wright (1806), the Supreme Court of Virginia ruled that American Indians were a free class of people and that freedom would be based on proof of Indian maternal descent. Other states followed Virginia's example and prohibited the enslavement of American Indians.

=== United States Census ===
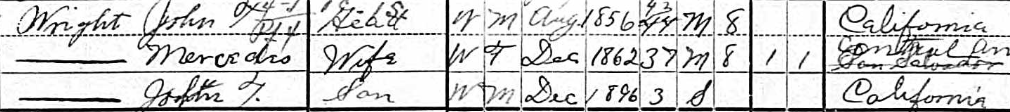
George Melendez Wright's Salvadoran-born mother Mercedes listed as "W" for white on the 1900 United States Census

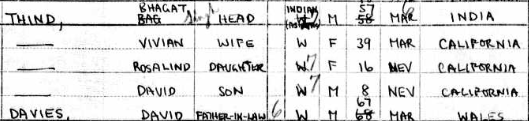
Bhagat Singh Thind on the 1950 federal census. His birthplace is listed as India. His race is initially listed as "W" for white, but the "W" is crossed out and "Indian (Asian)" is written over it.

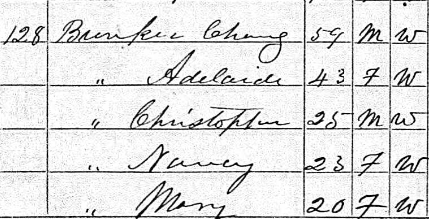
Siamese-born Chang Bunker listed as a white male on the 1870 census

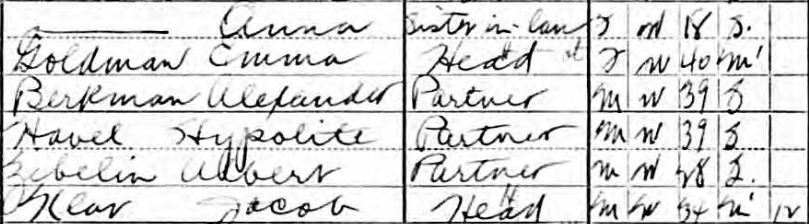
The Russian-born Jewish anarchists Emma Goldman and Alexander Berkman and the Czech-born anarchist Hippolyte Havel on the 1910 United States census. All have their race listed as "W" for white.

White people have been enumerated in every federal census since the first US census in 1790. At no point in US history has any European ethnic group or nationality been listed as non-white on the US federal census. Irish, Italian, Ashkenazi Jewish, Sephardi Jewish, Greek, Italian, Slavic, and other European immigrants have always been listed as white on the census. The first census in 1790 had options for "free white males", "free white females", "all other free persons", and "slaves". For the 1800 and 1810 US censuses, "all other free persons" was amended to say "all other free persons, except Indians not taxed". For the 1820, 1830, and 1840 US censuses, an option for "free colored persons" was added. For the censuses in 1850 and 1860, the options were "White", "Black", and "Mulatto". Prior to the Indian Citizenship Act of 1924, Native Americans were typically not citizens of the United States and were not always counted in the US census.

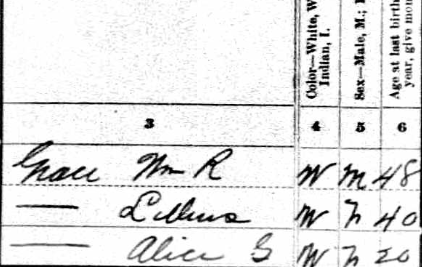
Irish-born William Russell Grace, the first Catholic mayor of New York City, listed as a white male on the 1880 census

Racial groups (1850 to 1920)
	White	Black/Negro	Mulatto	Chinese	Indian	Japanese	Quadroon	Octoroon	Filipinos	Hindus	Koreans	Other
1850	Y	Y	Y	N	N	N	N	N	N	N	N	N
1860	Y	Y	Y	N	N	N	N	N	N	N	N	N
1880	Y	Y	Y	Y	Y	N	N	N	N	N	N	N
1890	Y	Y	Y	Y	Y	Y	Y	Y	N	N	N	N
1900	Y	Y	N	Y	Y	Y	N	N	N	N	N	N
1910	Y	Y	Y	Y	Y	Y	N	N	N	N	N	Y
1920	Y	Y	Y	Y	Y	Y	N	N	Y	Y	Y	Y
1930	Y	Y	Y	Y	Y	Y	N	N	Y	Y	Y	Y

Racial groups (1930 to 1940)
	White	Negro	Mulatto	Chinese	Indian	Japanese	Filipinos	Hindus	Koreans	Mexican American	Other/Other (Please spell out (in full))
1930	Y	Y	Y	Y	Y	Y	Y	Y	Y	Y	Y
1940	Y	Y	Y	Y	Y	Y	Y	Y	Y	N	Y

The Census stated in 1940 that "Mexicans are to be regarded as White unless definitely of Indian or other nonwhite race." The decision to classify most Mexican-Americans as white was due to the advocacy of the League of United Latin American Citizens, a Latino rights organization that argued that (mestizo) Mexicans were a white race.

Racial groups (1950 to 1970)
	White	Black/ Negro	Chinese	Japanese	Filipinos	Other (Print race)	American Indian	Hawaiian	Hispanic
1950	Y	Y	Y	Y	Y	Y	Y	N	N
1960	Y	Y	Y	Y	Y	Y	Y	Y	N
1970	Y	Y	Y	Y	Y	Y	Y	Y	Y
1980	Y	Y	Y	Y	Y	Y	Y	Y	Y

Racial groups (1980 to Present)
	White	Black	Chinese	Japanese	Filipinos	Other	US Indian	Hawaiian	Hispanic	Vietinemese	Asian Indian	Guam	Samoa
1980	Y	Y	Y	Y	Y	Y	Y	Y	Y	Y	Y	Y	Y

As of the 2020 United States census, the definition of white included North African and Middle Easterners. Because of this, Arabs, Turks, Armenians, Yemenis, and other MENA immigrant groups are listed as white on the census. The classification of MENA people (Middle Eastern and North African) has been controversial. Some MENA people do not identify as white and have pushed for a separate MENA option on the US census. Some Jews, such as Mizrahi Jews or Israeli-American Jews, have also objected to being classified as white. Due to the history of antisemitic definitions of whiteness popular among some white supremacists, some Ashkenazi American Jews also object to being listed as white on the census.

== Name changes ==
According to the academics Joshua R. Goldstein and Guy Stecklov, European immigrants did not have to reject their foreign origins to access the white American mainstream, writing that "“Becoming White” by adopting an English surname was not a large part of historical immigrant experience. Rather, the overwhelming majority of immigrants chose to openly preserve their ethnic origins.

== See also ==
- Anti-Arab racism
- Anti-Irish sentiment
- Anti-Italian sentiment
- Antisemitism in the United States
- Covenant (law)
- Cultural assimilation of Native Americans
- Definitions of whiteness in the United States
- Ellis Island Special
- History of immigration and nationality law in the United States
- Honorary whites
- Irish slaves myth
- Lynching of American Jews
- Lynching of Italian Americans
- Passing (racial identity)
- Person of color
- Racial classification of Indian Americans
- WASP
- White defensiveness
- White ethnic
- Non-Hispanic whites
