= Whiteness studies =

Area of study on European-descendant culture

Whiteness studies is the study of the structures that produce white privilege; the examination of what whiteness is when analyzed as a race, a culture, and within the context of systemic racism; and the exploration of other social phenomena generated by the societal compositions, perceptions, and group behaviors of white people. It is an interdisciplinary arena of inquiry that has developed beginning in the United States from white trash studies and critical race studies, particularly since the late 20th century. It is focused on what proponents describe as the cultural, historical, and sociological aspects of people identified as white, and the social construction of "whiteness" as an ideology tied to social status.

Pioneers in the field include W. E. B. Du Bois ("Jefferson Davis as a Representative of Civilization", 1890; Darkwater, 1920), James Baldwin (The Fire Next Time, 1963), Theodore W. Allen (The Invention of the White Race, 1976, expanded in 1995), historian David Roediger (The Wages of Whiteness, 1991), author and literary critic Toni Morrison (Playing in the Dark: Whiteness and the Literary Imagination, 1992), and Ruth Frankenberg (White Women, Race Matters: The Social Construction of Whiteness, 1993).

By the mid-1990s, numerous works across many disciplines analyzed whiteness, and it has since become a topic for academic courses, research and anthologies. Some syllabuses associate the dismantling of white supremacy as a stated aim in the understanding of whiteness, while other sources view the field of study as primarily educational and exploratory, such as in questioning the objectivity of generations of works produced in intellectual spheres dominated by white scholars.

A central tenet of whiteness studies is a reading of history and its effects on the present that is inspired by postmodernism and historicism. According to this reading, racial superiority was socially constructed in order to justify discrimination against non-whites. Since the 19th century, some writers have argued that the phenotypical significance attributed to specific races are without biological association, and that what is called "race" is therefore not a biological phenomenon. Many scientists have demonstrated that racial theories are based upon an arbitrary clustering of phenotypical categories and customs, and can overlook the problem of gradations between categories. Thomas K. Nakayama and Robert L. Krizek write about whiteness as a "strategic rhetoric", asserting, in the essay "Whiteness: A Strategic Rhetoric", that whiteness is a product of "discursive formation" and a "rhetorical construction". Nakayama and Krizek write, "there is no 'true essence' to 'whiteness': there are only historically contingent constructions of that social location." Nakayama and Krizek also suggest that by naming whiteness, one calls out its centrality and reveals its invisible, central position. Whiteness is considered normal and neutral, therefore, to name whiteness means that one identifies whiteness as a rhetorical construction that can be dissected to unearth its values and beliefs.

Major areas of research in whiteness studies include the nature of white privilege and white identity, the historical process by which a white racial identity was created, the relation of culture to white identity, and possible processes of social change as they affect white identity.

== Definitions of whiteness ==
Zeus Leonardo defines whiteness as "a racial discourse, whereas the category 'white people' represents a socially constructed identity, usually based on skin color". Steve Garner notes that "whiteness has no stable consensual meaning" and that "the meanings attached to 'race' are always time- and place-specific, part of each national racial regime".

== Development of the field ==
Studies of whiteness as a unique identity could be said to begin among black people, who needed to understand whiteness to survive, particularly in slave societies such as the American colonies and United States. An important theme in this literature is, beyond the general "invisibility" of blacks to whites, the unwillingness of white people to consider that black people study them anthropologically. American author James Weldon Johnson wrote in his 1912 novel The Autobiography of an Ex-Colored Man that "colored people of this country know and understand the white people better than the white people know and understand them". Author James Baldwin wrote and spoke extensively about whiteness, defining it as a central social problem and insisting that it was choice, not a biological identity. In The Fire Next Time (1963), a non-fiction book on race relations in the United States, Baldwin suggests that:

White people in this country will have quite enough to do in learning how to accept and love themselves and each other, and when they have achieved this—which will not be tomorrow and may very well be never—the Negro problem will no longer exist, for it will no longer be needed.

A major black theory of whiteness connects this identity group with acts of terrorism—i.e., slavery, rape, torture, and lynching—against black people, who were treated as sub-human.

White academics in the United States and the United Kingdom (UK) began to study whiteness as early as 1983, creating a discipline called "whiteness studies". The "canon wars" of the late 1980s and 1990s, a term that refers to political controversy over the centrality of white authors and perspectives in United States culture, led the scholar Shelley Fisher Fishkin to ask "how the imaginative construction of 'whiteness' had shaped American literature and American history". The field developed a large body of work during the early 1990s, which, according to Fishkin, extends across the disciplines of "literary criticism, history, cultural studies, sociology, anthropology, popular culture, communication studies, music history, art history, dance history, humor studies, philosophy, linguistics, and folklore".

As of 2004, according to The Washington Post, at least 30 institutions in the United States including Princeton University, the University of California at Los Angeles, the University of New Mexico and University of Massachusetts Amherst offer, or have offered, courses in whiteness studies. Whiteness studies often overlaps with post-colonial theory, the study of orientalism, and anti-racist education.

One contribution to White Studies is Rich Benjamin's Searching for Whitopia: An Improbable Journey to the Heart of White America. The book examines white social beliefs and white anxiety in the contemporary United States, in the context of enormous demographic, cultural, and social change. The book explains how white privilege and segregation might flourish, even in the absence of explicit racial animus.

Another contribution to whiteness studies is Gloria Wekker's White Innocence: Paradoxes of Colonialism and Race, which discusses the immutability and fluidity of white identity and its relationship to innocence in the context of post-colonial Netherlands in the first decade of the twenty-first century. In Wekker's analysis, the process of separating Dutch from "Other" is facilitated through skin tone and non-Christian religious practices. According to Wekker, the process of racialization is reserved for mid-to-late twentieth century immigrant groups (Muslims, Black Surinamese, Black Antilleans), as a means of delineating groups outside the constructed immutable "norms" of Dutch society.

Sociologist Michael Eric Dyson contributed to the discussion of white identity in his 2017 book Tears We Cannot Stop: A Sermon to White America. Dyson's book specifically addresses "five dysfunctional ways that those regarded as white respond when confronted with the reality that whiteness is simultaneously artificial and powerful" as well as "dysfunctional ways that black people sometimes respond to white racism."

== Areas of study ==
=== Whiteness ===
Whiteness studies draws on research into the definition of race, originating with the United States but applying to racial stratification worldwide. This research emphasizes the historically recent social construction of white identity. As stated by W. E. B. Du Bois in 1920: "The discovery of a personal whiteness among the world's peoples is a very modern thing,—a nineteenth and twentieth century matter, indeed." The discipline examines how white, Native, and African/black identities emerged in interaction with the institutions of slavery, colonial settlement, citizenship, and industrial labor. Scholars such as Winthrop Jordan have traced the evolution of the legally defined line between "blacks" and "whites" to colonial government efforts to prevent cross-racial revolts among unpaid laborers.

Princeton professor Nell Irvin Painter, in her 2010 book The History of White People, says the idea of whiteness is not just a matter of biology but also includes "concepts of labor, gender, class, and images of personal beauty".(p. xi) The earliest European societies, including the Greeks and Romans, had no concept of race and classified people by ethnicity and social class, with the lowest class being slaves, most of whom were European in origin.(p. xi) Race science, developed in Europe in the 1800s, included intense analysis of different groups of Europeans, who were classified as belonging to three or four different races, with the most admirable being from northern Europe.(pp. 215–6) From the early days of the United States, whiteness was a criterion for full citizenship and acceptance into society. The American definition of whiteness evolved over time; initially groups such as Jews and Southern Europeans were not regarded as white, but as skin color became the primary criterion, they were gradually accepted. Painter argues that in the 21st century the definition of whiteness – or more precisely the definition of "nonblackness" – has continued to expand, so that now "The dark of skin who happen to be rich ... and the light of skin from any (racial background) who are beautiful, are now well on their way to inclusion." (pp. 389–90.)

Academic Joseph Pugliese is among writers who have applied whiteness studies to an Australian context, discussing the ways that Australian Aboriginals were marginalized in the wake of the European colonization of Australia, as whiteness came to be defined as central to Australian identity, diminishing Aboriginal identity in the process. Pugliese discusses the 20th-century White Australia policy as a conscious attempt to preserve the "purity" of whiteness in Australian society. Likewise Stefanie Affeldt considers whiteness "a concept not yet fully developed at the time the first convicts and settlers arrived down under" which, as a social relation, had to be negotiated and was driven forward in particular by the labour movement. Eventually, with the Federation of Australia, "[o]verlaying social differences, the shared membership in the 'white race' was the catalyst for the consolidation of the Australian colonies as the Commonwealth of Australia".

=== White backlash ===
White backlash or white rage in association with or as a consequence of whiteness is an area of investigation in whiteness studies. Sociologist Matthew Hughey has described this examination of racially-based backlash within its historical context; "Another approach to the study of whiteness centres on the white "back-lash" against the advances born from the civil rights movement."

Political scientist Danielle Allen has analyzed the intersection of whiteness with North American demographic changes, stating how they can "provoke resistance from those whose well-being, status and self-esteem are connected to historical privileges of 'whiteness'". Discussing the method of this resistance, Veronica Strong-Boag's co-edited Rethinking Canada: The Promise of Women's History explores how white backlash in Canada attempts to frames the defending of white interests as a "defence of national identity", rather than an acknowledgement of the political action of whiteness.

Scholar George Yancy has explored the societal response to perceived loss of racial privilege in his 2018 book Backlash; how reactions derived from whiteness fluctuate between Robin DiAngelo's concept of white fragility versus the more extreme backlashes throughout history.

=== White education ===
The study of white education and its intersection with whiteness is a continuing area of research in whiteness studies. Scholarly investigation has critiqued white-derived education as inevitably for the benefit of, organized by, and oriented towards white people. Horace Mann Bond was one of the early scholars to identify bias and privilege operating in white education systems. Bond critiqued suggestions African Americans were not intelligent enough to participate in the same schools as white Americans and campaigned against calls for literacy tests for suffrage. He challenged the Southern Manifesto and identified bias for funding white education, rather than universal funding, even within the reformist movement for desegregated schools.

Whiteness and privilege have continued in US education after Jim Crow versions of the segregationist ideology have lost their legitimacy due to legal and political failures. Privacy and individualism discourses mask white fear and newer forms of exclusion in contemporary education according to scholar, Charles R. Lawrence III.

=== White identity ===
Analyzing whiteness to forge new understandings of white identity has been a field of exploration for academics since the publications which largely founded modern whiteness studies in the mid-1990s. In exploring Ruth Frankenberg's works, and her interchanging use of the two concepts, the separation has been examined by scholars attempting to intellectually "disengtangle each from the other".

Sociologist Howard Winant, favoring a deconstructionist (rather than abolitionist) study of whiteness, suggests this methodology can help redefine and reorient understanding of white identity. In biological examination, whiteness studies has sought to expose how "white identity is neither pure nor unchanging – that its genealogy is mixed" in order to unearth biases within the white racial identity.

=== White privilege ===
In 1965, drawing from insights from Du Bois and inspired by the Civil Rights Movement, Theodore W. Allen began a 40-year analysis of "white skin privilege", "white race" privilege, and "white" privilege. In a piece he drafted for a "John Brown Commemoration Committee", he urged that "White Americans who want government of the people" and "by the people" to "begin by first repudiating their white skin privileges". From 1967 to 1969 various versions of the pamphlet, "White Blindspot", containing pieces by Allen and Noel Ignatin (Noel Ignatiev), focused on the struggle against "white skin privilege" and significantly influenced Students for a Democratic Society (SDS) and sectors of the New Left. By June 15, 1969, The New York Times was reporting that the National Office of SDS was calling "for an all-out fight against 'white skin privileges'".

In 1974–1975, Allen extended his analysis of "white privilege", racial oppression, and social control to the colonial period with his ground-breaking Class Struggle and the Origin of Racial Slavery: The Invention of the White Race. With continued research, he developed his ideas as his seminal two-volume The Invention of the White Race published in 1994 and 1997.

For almost forty years, Allen offered a detailed historical analysis of the origin, maintenance, and functioning of "white-skin privilege" and "white privilege" in such writings as: "White Supremacy in U.S. History" (1973); "Class Struggle and the Origin of Racial Slavery: The Invention of the White Race" (1975); "The Invention of the White Race", Vol. 1: "Racial Oppression and Social Control" (1994, 2012); "The Invention of the White Race", Vol. 2: "The Origin of Racial Oppression in Anglo-America" (1997, 2012); "Summary of the Argument of 'The Invention of the White Race'" Parts 1 and 2 (1998); "In Defense of Affirmative Action in Employment Policy" (1998); "'Race' and 'Ethnicity': History and the 2000 Census" (1999); and "On Roediger's Wages of Whiteness" (Revised Edition)";

In his historical work, Allen asserted that:

- the "white race" was invented as a ruling class social control formation in the late 17th-/early-18th century Anglo-American plantation colonies (principally Virginia and Maryland);
- central to this process was the ruling-class plantation bourgeoisie conferring "white race" privileges on European-American working people;
- these privileges were not only against the interests of African Americans, they were also "poison", "ruinous", a baited hook, to the class interests of working people;
- white supremacy, reinforced by "white skin privilege", has been the main retardant of working-class consciousness in the US; and
- struggle for radical social change should direct principal efforts at challenging white supremacy and "white skin privileges". Allen's work influenced Students for a Democratic Society (SDS) and sectors of the "new left" and paved the way for "white privilege", "race as social construct", and "whiteness studies". He also raised important questions about developments in those areas, and he avoided using the term "whiteness", using quotation marks when he did.

Laura Pulido writes about the relation of white privilege to racism:

White privilege [is] a highly structural and spatial form of racism ... I suggest that historical processes of suburbanization and decentralization are instances of white privilege and have contributed to contemporary patterns of environmental racism.

Pulido defines environmental racism as "the idea that nonwhites are disproportionately exposed to pollution".

Writers such as Peggy McIntosh say that social, political, and cultural advantages are accorded to whites in global society. She argues that these advantages seem invisible to white people, but obvious to non-whites. McIntosh argues that whites utilize their whiteness, consciously or unconsciously, as a framework to classify people and understand their social locations. In addition, even though many white people understand that whiteness is associated with privilege, they do not acknowledge their privilege because they view themselves as average and non-racist. Essentially, whiteness is invisible to white people.

For instance,

"I think whites are carefully taught not to recognize white privilege, as males are taught not to recognize male privilege. So I have begun in an untouched way to ask what it is like to have white privilege. I have come to see white privilege as an invisible package of unearned assets which I can count on cashing in each day, but about which I was 'meant' to remain oblivious" (188).

McIntosh calls for Americans to acknowledge white privilege so that they can more effectively attain equality in American society. She argues,

"To redesign social systems we need first to acknowledge their colossal unseen dimensions. The silences and denials surrounding privilege are the key political tool here. They keep the thinking about equality or equity incomplete, protecting unearned advantage and conferred dominance by making these taboo subjects" (192).

White privilege is also related to white guilt. As Shannon Jackson writes in the article, "White Noises: On Performing White, On Writing Performance" (1998), "The rhetorics of white guilt are tiresome, cliche, disingenuous, and everywhere. And now that the stereotype of 'the guilty white' is almost entrenched in its negativity as 'the racist white', people actively try to dis-identify from both."

=== White shift ===
White racial shift or decline, which has been abbreviated to the phrase whiteshift, and its intersection or connectedness to whiteness, has been a source of study and academic research within the field of whiteness studies. In relation to demographic decline of white people, the phenomenon has been analyzed as producing "a formal re-articulation of whiteness as a social category" in relation to fear-based politics with the US. Academic Vron Ware has examined this fear-based element in the sociology of resentment, and its intersection with class and whiteness. Ware analyzed how white decline, and its portrayal in British media, facilitated a victim or grievance culture, particularly among white British working-class communities.

Political scientist Charles King has proposed that, in the context of the numerical decline of white Americans, whiteness is progressively revealed to be driven by social power, rather than biology.

=== White socialization ===
White socialization or white-ethnic socialization is an emerging area of research in whiteness studies. Scholar Julia Carmen Rodil has analyzed the role that non-Hispanic white parents play in the racial socialization of white children, arguing that colorblindness as an ideology in upbringing leads to unchecked racism. Research suggests that white people are socialized to perceive race as a zero-sum game and a black-white binary and this informs the beliefs in reverse racism and prejudice plus power. For white youth, parents play a role in conversations around race and racism and this influences racial perceptions and biases into adulthood. Social media has also been found to play a role in the racial socialization of white adolescents.

== Schools of thought ==
=== Critical whiteness studies ===
An offshoot of critical race theory, theorists of critical whiteness studies seek to examine the construction and moral implications of whiteness, in order to reveal and deconstruct its assumed links to white privilege and white supremacy. Barbara Applebaum defines it as the "field of scholarship whose aim is to reveal the invisible structures that produce and reproduce white supremacy and privilege", and "presumes a certain conception of racism that is connected to white supremacy". Anoop Naya describes it as underpinned by the belief that whiteness is "a modern invention [which] has changed over time and place", "a social norm and has become chained to an index of unspoken privileges", and that "the bonds of whiteness can yet be broken/deconstructed for the betterment of humanity". There is a great deal of overlap between critical whiteness studies and critical race theory, as demonstrated by focus on the legal and historical construction of white identity, and the use of narratives (whether legal discourse, testimony or fiction) as a tool for exposing systems of racial power.

== Whiteness and architecture ==
In the early 21st century, architectural historians have published studies related to the construction of whiteness in the built environment. Studies have grappled with the exclusionary nature of the architectural profession, which erected barriers for nonwhite practitioners, the ways in which architects and designers have employed motifs, art programs, and color schemes that reflected the aspirations of European-Americans and, most recently, with the racialization of space.

== Criticisms ==
Conservative writers David Horowitz and Douglas Murray draw a distinction between whiteness studies and other analogous disciplines. Writes Horowitz, "Black studies celebrates blackness, Chicano studies celebrates Chicanos, women's studies celebrates women, and white studies attacks white people as evil." Dagmar R. Myslinska, an adjunct associate professor of law at Fordham University, argues that whiteness studies overlooks the heterogeneity of white experience, be it due to class, immigrant status, or geographical location. Alastair Bonnett argues that whiteness studies treated "white" culture as a homogenous and stable "racial entity" – for example, Bonnett observes that whiteness researchers in Britain argued that white British people lived in a homogenous "white culture" (which Bonnett observed was never clearly described), with the researchers completely ignoring British culture's regional diversity, despite having ample opportunity to study it.

Whiteness studies has earned a mixed reception from academics in other fields. In 2001, historian Eric Arnesen wrote that "whiteness has become a blank screen onto which those who claim to analyze it can project their own meanings" and that the field "suffers from a number of potentially fatal methodological and conceptual flaws." First, Arnesen writes that the core theses of whiteness studies—that racial categories are arbitrary social constructs without definite biological basis, and that some white Americans benefit from racist discrimination of non-whites—have been common wisdom in academia for many decades and are hardly as novel or controversial as whiteness studies scholars seem to believe. Additionally, Arnesen accuses whiteness studies scholars of sloppy thinking; of making claims not supported by their sources; of overstating supporting evidence; and of cherry picking to neglect contrary information.

He notes that a particular datum almost entirely ignored by whiteness studies scholars is religion, which has played a prominent role in conflicts among various American classes. He says that a type of "keyword literalism" persists in whiteness studies, where important words and phrases from primary sources are taken out of their historical context. Whiteness has so many different definitions that the word is "nothing less than a moving target". Arnesen notes that whiteness studies scholars are entirely on the far left of the political spectrum, and suggests that their apparent vitriol towards white Americans is due in part to white workers not fulfilling the predictions of Marxist theory that the proletariat would overcome racial, national and class distinctions to unite and overthrow capitalism. He cites, as an example, David Roediger's afterword to the seminal Wages of Whiteness, which asserts that the book was written as a reaction to "the appalling extent to which white male workers voted for Reaganism in the 1980s." Arnesen argues that in the absence of supporting evidence, whiteness studies often rely on amateurish Freudian speculation about the motives of white people: "The psychoanalysis of whiteness here differs from the 'talking cure' of Freudianism partly in its neglect of the speech of those under study." Without more accurate scholarship, Arnesen writes that "it is time to retire whiteness for more precise historical categories and analytical tools."

In 2002, historian Peter Kolchin offered a more positive assessment and declared that, at its best, whiteness studies has "unfulfilled potential" and offers a novel and valuable means of studying history. Particularly, he praises scholarship into the development of the concept of whiteness in the United States, and notes that the definition and implications of a white racial identity have shifted over the decades. Yet Kolchin describes a "persistent sense of unease" with certain aspects of whiteness studies. There is no consensus definition of whiteness, and thus the word is used in vague and contradictory ways, with some scholars even leaving the term undefined in their articles or essays." Kolchin also objects to "a persistent dualism evident in the work of the best whiteness studies authors", who often claim that whiteness is a social construct while also arguing, paradoxically, that whiteness is an "omnipresent and unchanging" reality existing independent of socialization. Kolchin agrees that entering a post-racial paradigm might be beneficial for humanity, but he challenges the didactic tone of whiteness studies scholars who single out a white racial identification as negative, while praising a black or Asian self-identification. Scholars in whiteness studies sometimes seriously undermine their arguments by interpreting historical evidence independent of its broader context (e.g., Karen Brodkin's examination of American anti-semitism largely neglects its roots in European anti-semitism). Finally, Kolchin categorically rejects the argument—common amongst many whiteness scholars—that racism and whiteness are intrinsically and uniquely American, and he expresses concern at the "belief in the moral emptiness of whiteness [...] there is a thin line between saying that whiteness is evil and saying that whites are evil."

Theodore W. Allen, pioneering writer on "white skin privilege" and "white privilege" from the 1960s until his death in 2005, offered a critical review "On Roediger's Wages of Whiteness" (Revised Edition). He personally put "whiteness" in quotes because he shied away from using the term. As Allen explained,

"it's an abstract noun, it's an abstraction, it's an attribute of some people, it's not the role they play. And the white race is an actual objective thing. It's not anthropologic, it's a historically developed identity of European Americans and Anglo-Americans and so it has to be dealt with. It functions... in this history of ours and it has to be recognized as such. ... to slough it off under the heading of 'whiteness,' to me seems to get away from the basic white race identity trauma."

In a scholarly debate with whiteness studies pioneer David Roediger, Eric Kaufmann, a scholar of political demography and identity politics and the author of Whiteshift (which was criticised for defending white identity politics), criticizes the field as a whole, arguing :

"White Studies suffers from a number of serious flaws which should lead us to question whether this approach can continue to advance the frontiers of knowledge in the wider sphere of ethnic and racial studies".. These flaws include: 1) a constructivism which fails to recognise the cognitive and social processes that underpin social 'reality'; 2) an excessive emphasis on ethnic boundaries as opposed to ethnic narratives, thereby overstating the degree of malleability possible in ethnic identity; 3) a tacit belief in white exceptionalism, which overemphasises the ideological character of whiteness and deifies whites; 4) an elision of dominant ethnicity and race; and 5) a threefold parochialism in terms of place, time horizon and the role of race in ethnic studies."

Kaufmann then proposes, as an alternative approach to the study of white identity, the emerging concept of "dominant ethnicity", using Anthony D. Smith's definition of "ethnic group" as a "named, imagined, human community, many of whose members believe in a myth of shared ancestry and place of origin."

== See also ==
- Becoming white thesis
- Blanqueamiento
- Critical race theory
- Whiteness theory
- African-American studies
