= Don Hamerquist =

American author and political activist

Don Hamerquist (born 1939) is an activist, author, and political theorist. Alongside Noel Ignatiev, Hamerquist was a leader of the new communist Sojourner Truth Organization.

== Early life and education ==
Raised in Pysht, Washington on the Olympic Peninsula, Hamerquist became active in the Communist Party, USA in his twenties while attending Reed College in Portland, OR, where he enrolled in 1957. Hamerquist attended Reed until 1962, having taken classes in history and sociology, and partially completing a thesis on Progressive Party foreign policy. After Reed, Hamerquist was employed as a truck driver, a job he held alongside his work in the Party throughout the decade. Hamerquist co-coordinated the Community Party's organizing activities in Oregon alongside chairman Ralph Nelson, focusing on the Party's youth activities and serving on the national council of the Party's Progressive Youth Organizing Committee and on the Party's National Committee. Hamerquist was also a registered member of the Oregon Democratic Party, and was elected in 1966 as a Democratic Party committeeperson of the 400th Precinct in Multnomah County. Under surveillance by the Federal Bureau of Investigation, in 1967 an informant who Hamerquist had unknowingly recruited into the Communist Party testified before an executive session of the House Committee on Un-American Activities, making public Hamerquist's Party affiliation. Hamerquist openly admitted to his Communist Party membership in several subsequent interviews with the press, prompting the Multnomah County Democratic Party Central Committee Democratic Party to circulate a petition for his resignation as committeeperson. Refusing to resign, Hamerquist was eventually recalled from his position by the Democratic Party's Central Committee membership.

Following his ouster, Hamerquist continued his work in the Communist Party, helping to campaign for presidential candidate Charlene Mitchell and coordinating protests against the Vietnam War. Hamerquist was at the time a protégé of then-Party General Secretary Gus Hall and rumored to be Hall's eventual successor. However, Hamerquist continued to attract federal and local law enforcement attention for his activities, and was eventually subpoenaed by Subversive Activities Control Board. By 1968, Hamerquist had relocated to Chicago to help plan demonstrations against the 1968 Democratic National Convention on behalf of the Party. However, following the Soviet invasion of Czechoslovakia, and increasingly under the influence of the New Left Hamerquist became disillusioned with the Communist Party, eventually leading an unsuccessful internal campaign to unseat the Party's national leadership. Before Hamerquist could be expelled for this attempt, he resigned. Hamerquist continued political organizing, helping to raise bail for jailed founding Portland Black Panther Party member Ken Ford in 1969, but chose to remain in Chicago where he would help to found the Sojourner Truth Organization later that year.

== Sojourner Truth Organization ==
Hamerquist served as a founding member of the Sojourner Truth Organization (STO), alongside Evie and Michael Goldfield, Marylin Katz, Noel Ignatiev, Carole Travis, and Ken Lawrence, having been present at its initial meetings in 1969. Hamerquist also served as the STO's longest running member, having remained with the organization until its dissolution in 1986 Having emerged from the dissolution of the Students for a Democratic Society, the STO included members from several left-wing political organizations including the Revolutionary Youth Movement and the CPUSA, of which Hamerquist had been a member. Throughout the history of the STO, Hamerquist helped to develop the political theory that guided the organization's activism. During the organization's initial period spanning from 1970 until 1975, Hamerquist was instrumental in the development of the STO's theory of 'dual consciousness' articulated in the party's pamphlet Toward a Revolutionary Party which drew from the work of Italian Marxist Antonio Gramsci. At this time, Hamerquist was employed at the Chicago Stewart-Warner factory at which several members of STO worked during this period for the purposes of organizing the factory's workers independent of the labor union at the plant. Similarly, when the focus of STO's organizing pivoted toward anti-imperialism after 1975, Hamerquist's discussion paper White Supremacy and the Afro-American National Question served as an important document for the organization.

== Activism and writing after the Sojourner Truth Organization ==
Following the dissolution of the STO in 1986, Hamerquist remained in Chicago operating the C&D Printshop with his wife Janeen Porter. The Printshop was purchased while Hamerquist was a member of STO and it served to disseminate the organization's writings as well as the pamphlets of other left-wing organizations. In 2001, Hamerquist and Porter relocated to the Olympic Peninsula in Washington. Hamerquist continued to publish essays in various media, including through email listservs, blogs, and occasionally in co-authored books. Hamerquist's later writing, collected in the volume Brilliant Red Thread addresses the theories of Vladimir Lenin, globalization, and philosophical writing of Alain Badiou. In recent years, Hamerquist has written about contemporary fascism and anti-fascism, as well as the concept of a 'three-way fight' in regard to contemporary fascist movements.

== Bibliography ==
=== Books ===
- Hamerquist, Don; Sakai, J; Salotte, Mark; Anti-Racist Action (2002). Confronting Fascism: Discussion Documents for a Militant Movement. Kersplebedeb Publishing. ISBN 978-1-894946-87-2.
- Hamerquist, Don (2023). Brennan, Luis (ed.). A Brilliant Red Thread: Revolutionary writings from Don Hamerquist. Kersplebedeb Publishing. ISBN 978-1-989701-22-5.

=== Pamphlets ===
- Hamerquist, Don (1970). "Reflections on Organizing". In Sojourner Truth Organization (ed.). Workplace Papers. Chicago.
- Hamerquist, Don; Ignatin, Noel (1970). "A Call to Organize". In Sojourner Truth Organization (ed.). Workplace Papers. Chicago.
- Hamerquist, Don (1976). White Supremacy and the Afro-American National Question. Chicago.
