= Ellis Island Special =

Family names changed in U.S. immigration, often at Ellis Island

An Ellis Island Special is a family name that is perceived or labeled, incorrectly, as having been anglicized or otherwise altered by immigration officials at the Ellis Island immigration station when a family reached the United States, typically from Europe in the late 19th and early 20th centuries. In popular lore, some family lore, and literary fiction, certain family names are thought to have been shortened by immigration officials for ease of pronunciation and/or record-keeping, or simply due to lack of understanding of the true name—even though the name changes were made by the immigrants themselves at other times. Immigration officials at Ellis Island did not write down the names of immigrants. Names were only written down on shipping manifests by officials in Europe or elsewhere. Before visas existed, there was no official identification of immigrants arriving at Ellis Island. Immigration officials at Ellis Island opened the shipping manifest to inspect the names of arriving immigrants and to ask them questions, but did not write any names down.

Among the surnames that are thought of as being "Ellis Island Specials" are many that were viewed as more identifiably Jewish, resulting in last names that were not identifiably so. Also, Germanic- and Yiddish-derived names originally spelled with an eszett (spoken with an s sound but written ß) have been ascribed to family names like Straub (given the similarity with the letter B), which might have been said originally as Strauss in the Old World.

The phrase "Ellis Island Special" has also been adopted by some food vendors and applied to sandwiches, among other foods.

== History ==
According to the history professor Kirsten Fermaglich, the idea that officials at Ellis Island changed immigrants' names upon arrival "did not become an important image in published literature until around 1970", decades after Ellis Island had ceased to serve as an immigration arrival station. The influential 1974 film The Godfather Part II depicted the fictional Sicilian boy Vito Andolini being assigned the name Vito Corleone by an Ellis Island official. Professional genealogist Megan Smolenyak has blamed the perpetuation of the myth on that film, as well as on "immigrant grandfathers who enjoyed spinning yarns to confuse their offspring".

As the earlier tendency toward cultural assimilation among American Jews transitioned into ethnic pride, a false narrative of victimization arose which contended that name-changing was something done to Jewish immigrants against their will in order to de-Judaize them, rather than having been the choice of the immigrants themselves.

== See also ==
- Becoming white thesis
- Irish slaves myth
- Jewish assimilation
