= White ethnic =

White Americans

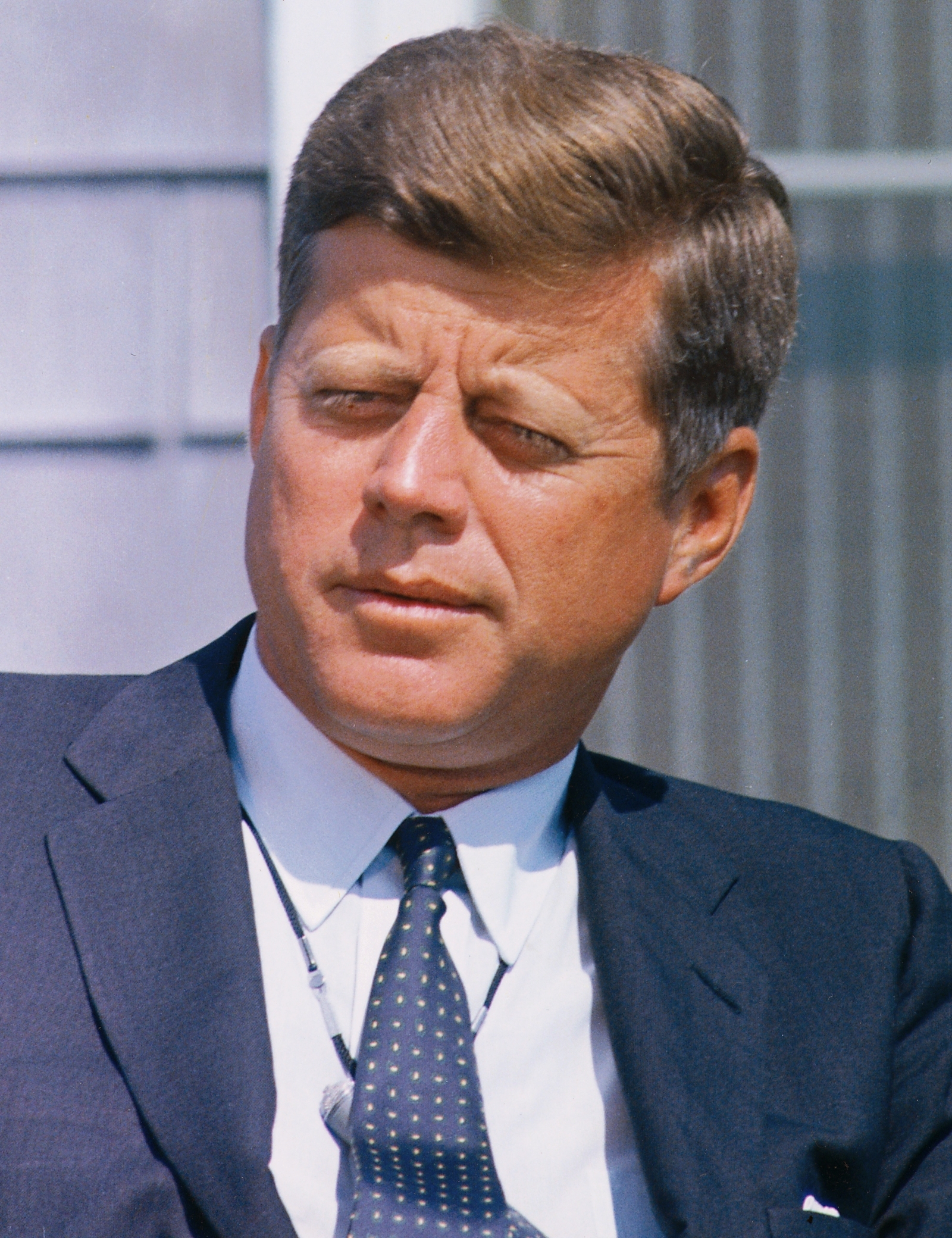
John F. Kennedy, 35th President of the United States and the first white ethnic President

White ethnic is a term used to refer to white Americans who are not Old Stock or white Anglo-Saxon Protestant. They consist of a number of distinct groups and make up approximately 69.4% of the white population in the United States. The term usually refers to the descendants of immigrants from Southern, Central and Eastern Europe, Ireland, the Caucasus and France/Francophone Canada. Italian Americans, Polish Americans, Russian Americans, Czech Americans and Slovak Americans, Hungarian Americans and Austrian Americans Spanish Americans are considered white ethnic.

== History ==
In the 19th century, American industrial development caused millions of immigrants to emigrate from Europe to the United States. Many came to provide labor for the industrial growth of the Northeast and Midwest, and multitudes of immigrants from non British or non-Germanic Protestant backgrounds settled in the nation's growing cities. This immigration wave continued until 1924 when Congress enacted the Johnson–Reed Act, which restricted immigration as a whole and from southern and eastern European countries in particular. Additionally, the onset of the Great Depression in the 1930s acted as a deterrent to further immigration to the United States from Europe.

Separated from the ruling class by blood, religion and economic circumstances, white ethnics retained a strong and distinct sense of identity from the majority culture. During the early 20th century, many white ethnics were relegated to menial or unskilled labor. They were often subject to ethnic discrimination and xenophobia and were lampooned with stereotypes. Historian and reformer Andrew Dickson White lamented that, in American cities, "a crowd of illiterate peasants, freshly raked from Irish bogs, or Bohemian mines, or Italian robber nests, may exercise virtual control." Religion was another big factor in this alienation from broader American society. In contrast to the mostly Protestant and Anglo-Saxon majority, white ethnics tended to practice Catholicism, Eastern Orthodox Christianity, or Judaism. These ethnic, cultural and religious differences helped them retain a strong and separate identity from the rest of America until the post war era.

In the 1950s and 1960s, suburbanization caused many young ethnics, many of whom were veterans, to leave the city and settle in the nation's burgeoning suburbs with the hope of rising into a higher economic class. In the 1960s and 1970s, several ethnic organizations became vocal in promoting white ethnic culture and interests. At the same time, white ethnics became more involved in American political life at a national level and began to challenge the majority Protestant ruling class for greater political power.

The election of John F. Kennedy, in 1960, was the first time that a white ethnic (Irish Catholic) was elected President of the United States. However, it was not the first time that a white ethnic was nominated for the presidency: Al Smith, also Irish Catholic, was the first to be nominated for president on a major party ticket, in 1928. Spiro Agnew, a Greek-American, was the first white ethnic elected vice president, in 1968.

Since Kennedy, white ethnics have become more common on major party tickets. Eight Catholics have been vice presidential candidates. The Republicans were William Miller (1964) and Paul Ryan (2012). The Democrats were Ed Muskie (1968), Sargent Shriver (1972), Geraldine Ferraro (1984), Joe Biden (2008 and 2012), and Tim Kaine (2016). Biden was elected both times, becoming the first Roman Catholic and non-Protestant vice president. Biden would later be elected president in 2020.

In 1964, Barry Goldwater became the first major party presidential candidate of Jewish heritage. Had he been elected in 1988, Michael Dukakis would have been the first Greek-American and first Eastern Orthodox Christian president. Joe Lieberman was the first Jewish person to be nominated for vice-president on a major party ticket, in 2000.

== Urban politics ==
White ethnic ward heelers dominated the Democratic political machines of America's major cities throughout the first half of the 20th century. The ward heelers were often Irish Catholics in close alliance with those of other ethnicities, such as Ashkenazi Jews and Italians in New York City and Polish-Americans and other Eastern Europeans in Chicago. In New York City, Tammany Hall was the dominant political machine that controlled political patronage positions and nominations, and figures like Carmine DeSapio were powerful kingmakers on a national level. However, many left the Democratic Party as it has moved leftward since the late 1960s, and they became a key component of the socially conservative Reagan Democrats during the 1980s.

With increased suburbanization and the continued assimilation of white ethnics and their subsequent replacement by newer immigrant groups, many of the remaining white ethnics have lost much of their political power in urban politics in the early 21st century.

== See also ==
- Becoming white thesis
- Ethnic origin
- Hyphenated American
- Symbolic ethnicity
- Other White, a census designation used in the United Kingdom
- Mediterranean race
- Albanian Americans
- Armenian Americans
- Bulgarian Americans
- Croatian Americans
- Czech Americans
- French Americans
- German Americans
- Greek Americans
- Turkish Americans
- Hungarian Americans
- Irish Americans
- Italian Americans
- Jewish Americans
- Lithuanian Americans
- Polish Americans
- Portuguese Americans
- Romanian Americans
- Russian Americans
- Serbian Americans
- Spanish Americans
- Ukrainian Americans
- History of ethnocultural politics in the United States
