= Assyrian Muslim Cemetery =

Historic cemetery in North Dakota, United States

- Syrian Muslim Cemetery
- U.S. National Register of Historic Places
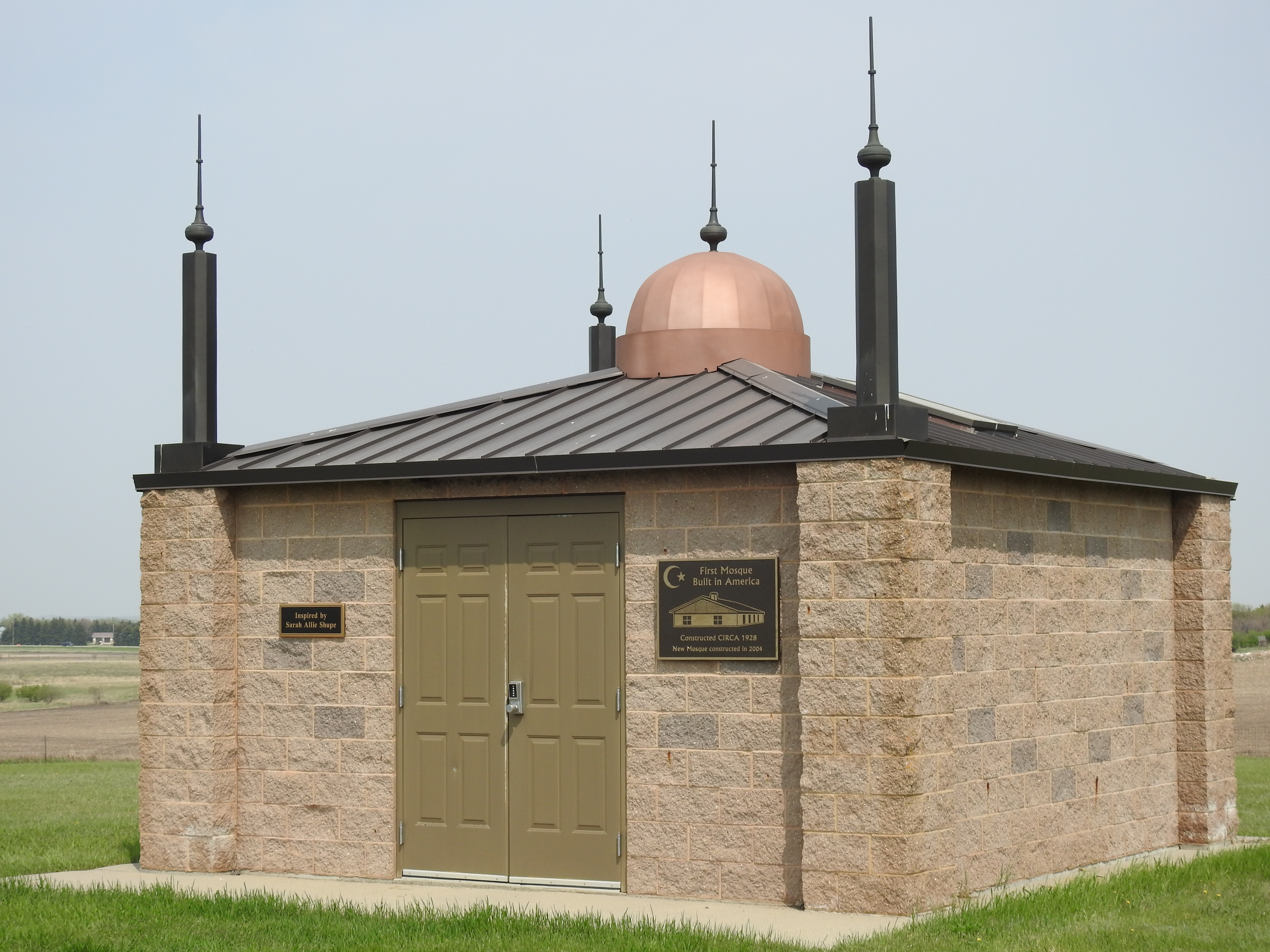

- Location within North Dakota Location within the United States
- Nearest city: Ross, North Dakota
- Coordinates: 48°18′20″N 102°30′17″W
- NRHP reference No.: 100002693
- Added to NRHP: July 17, 2018

The Assyrian Muslim Cemetery is a Muslim cemetery in Mountrail County, North Dakota, which was listed on the National Register of Historic Places in 2018. It is the oldest Muslim cemetery in the United States, and was the only Muslim cemetery in North Dakota for 90 years. It is located 1/4 mile south of US 2 on 87th Ave. NW, near Ross.

== Mosque ==
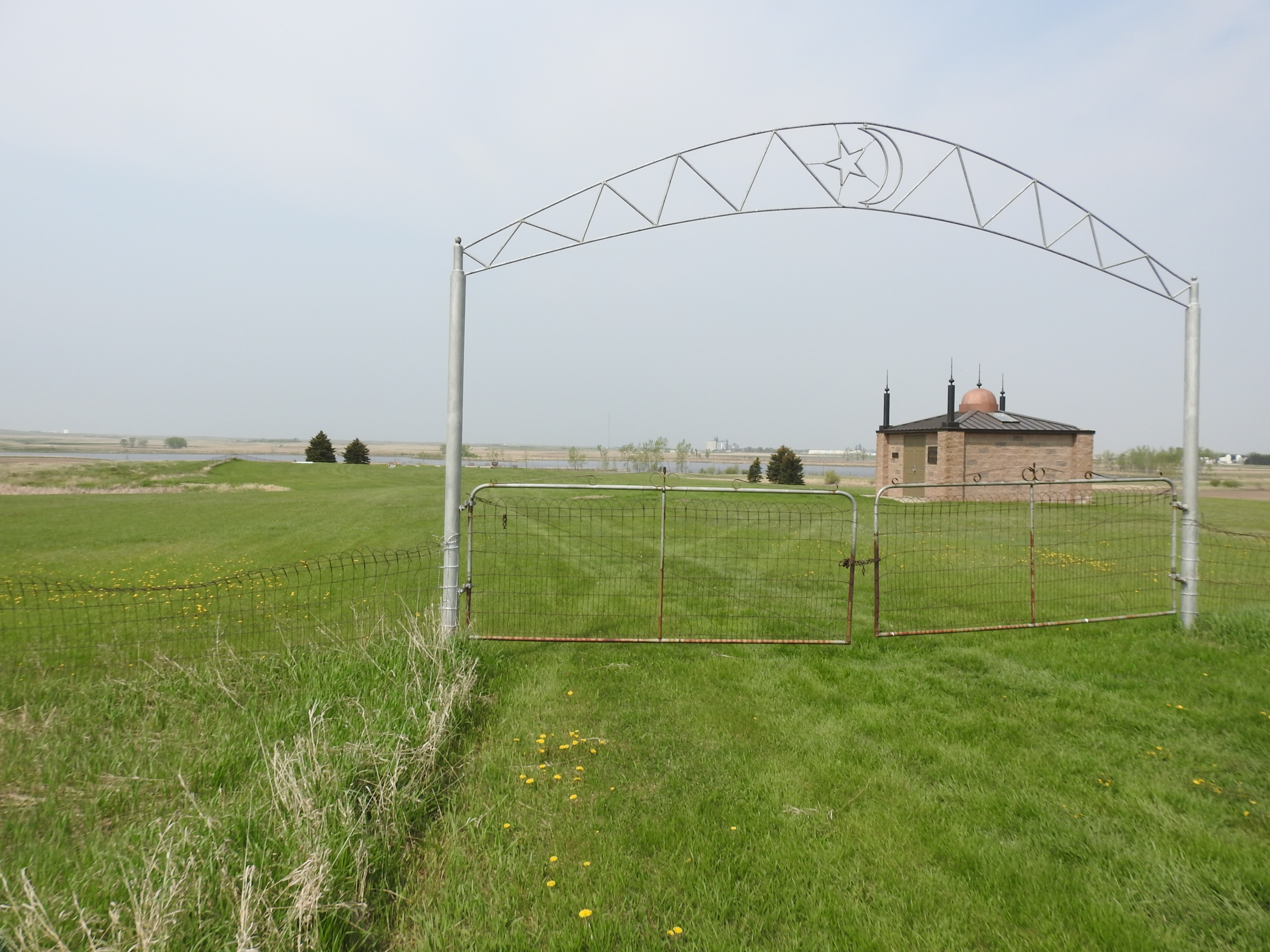

The original mosque at the site was built in 1929 by Homesteading immigrants from what is now Lebanon and Syria. A modest 15 by 15 feet (4.6 m × 4.6 m) replacement mosque was built in 2005, although it was built for historical purposes and is rarely used.
