= Michael Goldfield =

American political scientist

- Born: May 2, 1943

Academic background
- Education: Ph.D
- Alma mater: Williams College (B.A., 1965); University of Chicago (Ph.D., 1984)
- Thesis: Organized Labor in the United States of America: Its Recent Decline and Future Prospects as Reflected in NLRB Union Certification Election Results (1984)
- Academic advisors: Ira Katznelson, Adam Przeworski, Philippe Schmitter

Academic work
- Discipline: Political scientist
- Institutions: Wayne State University (1992-present); Cornell University (1984-1992)

Michael Goldfield (May 2, 1943) is an American political scientist, author, labor activist, and former student activist. He is an emeritus professor of industrial relations and human resources in the department of political science at Wayne State University in Detroit, Michigan, and a faculty associate at the Harry Bridges Center for Labor Studies at the University of Washington.

== Early life and activism: Sojourner Truth Organization 1968-1972 ==
Prior to his academic career, Goldfield was an activist and organizer, first with the Students for a Democratic Society and later with the Sojourner Truth Organization, where he was a founding member and a part of the organization's Westside branch. Goldfield was employed at the International Harvester plant in Melrose Park, IL where he sought to engage in workplace organizing as a part of the Sojourner Truth Organization's political work. At the International Harvester plant, Goldfield was involved in establishing a dissident caucus within the plant's union chapter organized by the United Auto Workers. Despite resolutions adopted by the Sojourner Truth Organization calling on membership to engage in more mass organizing, which entailed a further openness to engaging with industrial unions, the Organization as a whole remained critical to unions and a significant tendency within the Organization remained skeptical of membership involving themselves in trade union politics.^{,} ^{a} As one of the Organization's most experienced workplace organizers, and a member whose rank-and-file coworkers encouraged him to run as a shop steward at the Harvester plant, Goldfield expressed enthusiasm in greater union involvement, a decision for which certain membership within the Organization criticized him.

In 1973, Goldfield, who felt that this criticism led to his marginalization within the Organization, co-wrote a position paper endorsed by the Organization's Westside branch entitled "Crisis in the STO," which issued criticisms of numerous aspects of Organization's positions, from class consciousness to its theoretical positions on party formation. After the release of the paper, Goldfield and his supporters eventually departed the Sojourner Truth Organization, resulting in the Organization's first split.

== Career ==
Goldfield has contributed to scholarly discussions on the labor history of the United States, particularly to debates on the cause of union density decline, and its relationship to race and ethnicity in the United States. In his first book, The Decline of Organized Labor in the United States, Goldfield argues that the decline of American union density beginning in 1955 was the result of both changes in government policy that restricted workers' rights to unionize, including the Labor Management Relations Act of 1947, and the growth of anti-union consulting agencies, which businesses employ to deter union organizing. Goldfield's contribution to the debate on union density decline has been recognized as significant in that it attributes the decline in union power not to American demographic and industrial shifts but instead to an increasing political hostility to unions in the United States.

In Goldfield's second book, The Color of Politics: Race and the Mainsprings of American Politics, he argues that progressive and socialist politics in the United States have been stifled by racism. Further, Goldfield claims that the failure of American labor unions to confront racism and organize African-American workers contributed to the inability of labor unions to play a greater political role in American society. Francis Fox Piven referred to the book as a "magisterial review of the role of racism in American history".

Goldfield has also participated in debates within political science on the origins of the New Deal. In response to Theda Skocpol's critiques of Neo-Marxist theories of the state, Goldfield issued a defense culminating in an exchange in American Political Science Review. Skocpol's defense of her critiques, and her subsequent assessment of Goldfield's arguments in what have become known as the Wagner Act Debates, are regarded as an important moment in the development of academic theories of the state.

A festschrift honoring Goldfield's contributions to the social sciences was published by Brill and Haymarket Books in 2026. Edited by Goldfield's former mentee and current professor of sociology at Loyola University New Orleans, Cody R. Melcher, the volume includes contributions from Alex Callinicos, Bryan D. Palmer, Brian Kelly, Dan La Botz, Charles Post, and others.

== Selected bibliography ==
=== Solely authored books ===
- (1987) The Decline of Organized Labor in the United States (Chicago: The University of Chicago Press) (ISBN 0226301036)
- (1997) The Color of Politics: Race and the Mainsprings of American Politics (New York: The New Press) (ISBN 1565843258)
- (2020) The Southern Key: Class, Race, and Radicalism in the 1930s and 1940s (New York: Oxford University Press) (ISBN 0190079320)

=== Co-authored books ===
- (1980) The Myth of Capitalism Reborn: A Marxist Critique of Theories of Capitalist Restoration in the USSR by Michael Goldfield and Melvin Rothenberg (San Francisco: Line of March Publications)

=== Edited volumes ===
- (2008) Labour, Globalization and the State: Workers, Women and Migrants Confront Neoliberalism edited by Debdas Banerjee and Michael Goldfield (London: Routledge) (ISBN 0415558905)

=== Festschrift ===
- (2026) Class, Race, and the US South: American Politics and Society through the Lens of Michael Goldfield's Work edited by Cody R. Melcher, Olivier Maheo, and Esther Cyna (Leiden: Brill) (ISBN 9789004747647)

== Notes ==
a.For a synopsis of this position within the Sojourner Truth Organization see "The Steward's Position" published in 1973, which closes with the lines "The call to stewardship will probably be heard by any communist who is doing good mass work. It should be accepted for what it is ... a call to take a greater role of leadership ... To the extent that it is a call to leadership, the communist should respond not by taking the steward's position but by creating an alternative to it."
