= Race Traitor (publication) =

American magazine (1992–2005)

- Categories: Political magazine
- Frequency: Quarterly
- Founder: John Garvey, Noel Ignatiev
- First issue: 1992; 33 years ago
- Final issue Number: 2005; 20 years ago 16
- Language: English
- Website: racetraitor.org
- OCLC: 29715684

Race Traitor was a quarterly magazine founded in 1992 by John Garvey and Noel Ignatiev. Its stated mission was "to serve as an intellectual center" for those seeking to abolish white privilege. As Ignatiev expressed it, its purpose was "to explore how people who had been brought up as white might become unwhite".

The magazine's premise was that racial categories were constructed to create a social hierarchy that benefits whites at the expense of people of color. The "white" race is explained as an exclusive club which the magazine seeks to dissolve and break apart. Thus, the task of individual race traitors is to abolish the white race through treasonous acts. According to Ignatiev: "We at Race Traitor . . . have asked some of those who think whiteness contains any positive elements to indicate what they are. We are still waiting for an answer. Until we get one, we will take our stand with David Roediger, who has insisted that whiteness is not merely oppressive and false, it is nothing but oppressive and false."

The magazine and its community of activists acted in close, if sometimes contentious, relation with the field of whiteness studies. The last issue was number 16, the "Special Palestine Issue" dated Winter 2005. The publication's motto was "Treason to whiteness is loyalty to humanity."

The magazine's audience included academics, grassroots activists, prisoners, and students of many racial and sexual identities. As of 2002 it had been cited over 110 times.
