= Frederick Douglass and the White Negro =

- Directed by: John J. Doherty
- Written by: John J. Doherty
- Produced by: Catherine Lyons
- Starring: Marcus Valentine; Aaron Edo; Fred Lawal; Matilda Edo; JohnLuka Doherty
- Narrated by: John J. Doherty
- Cinematography: Ronan Fox; Martin Birney; John J. Doherty
- Edited by: Juris Eksts
- Music by: Cyril Dunnion
- Release date: 2008
- Running time: 52 minutes
- Countries: United States; Ireland
- Language: English

Frederick Douglass and the White Negro is a 2008 American-Irish documentary telling the story of ex-slave, abolitionist, writer and politician Frederick Douglass and his anti-slavery lecture tour in Ireland in 1845 while avoiding capture as a fugitive in the United States. It is often shown on national television in the U.S.

== Synopsis ==
The film follows Douglass's life from slavery as a young man through to his time in Ireland, where he befriended Daniel O'Connell, toured the country spreading the message of abolition and was treated as a human being for the first time by white people. His arrival in Ireland coincided with the Great Famine, and he witnessed white people in what he considered to be a worse state than his fellow Black Americans back in the US.

The film follows Douglass back to America, where he buys his freedom with funds raised in Ireland and Britain. Fellow passengers on his return journey include the Irish escaping the famine who arrived in their millions and would go on to play a major role in the New York Draft Riot of 1863, which Douglass could only despair over. The film examines (with contributions from the author of How The Irish Became White Noel Ignatiev amongst others) the turbulent relationship between African Americans and Irish Americans during the American Civil War, what drew them together and what drove them apart and how this would shape the America of the twentieth century and beyond.

== See also ==
- List of films featuring slavery
- 12 Years a Slave
