= Ruth Frankenberg =

British American sociologist

- Born: Ruth Alice Emma Frankenberg; September 17, 1957; Cardiff, Wales
- Died: April 22, 2007 (aged 49); Bangalore, India
- Education: New Hall, Cambridge, University of California, Santa Cruz
- Known for: Whiteness studies
- Partner: Lata Mani
- Scientific career
- Fields: Sociology
- Workplaces: University of Washington, University of California, Davis
- Thesis: White women, race matters: the social construction of whiteness (1988)

Ruth Alice Emma Frankenberg (17 September 1957 – 22 April 2007) was a British–American social scientist and feminist, known for her pioneering work in the field of whiteness studies.

== Biography ==
Ruth Frankenberg was born in Cardiff, Wales, 17 September 1957. She was the daughter of Ronald Frankenberg (1929–2015), an anthropologist best known for his work Village on the Border, which demonstrated how anthropological methods could be appropriately applied to British society. Her partner Lata Mani is a feminist and historian, currently residing in California. Mani is the author of Contentious Traditions, an analysis of widow burning in colonial India. She is of Jewish descent through her father.

She was educated in Cambridge and at the University of California, Santa Cruz.

Frankenberg is the author of White Women, Race Matters: The Social Construction of Whiteness, as well as a prolific contributor to many journals on the study of whiteness, including her essay The Mirage of an Unmarked Whiteness. In White Women, Race Matters: The Social Construction of Whiteness, Frankenberg argues race shapes both the lives of the oppressor (white people, according to Frankenberg) as well as the oppressed. Frankenberg suggests that the white women she interviewed for White Women, Race Matters: The Social Construction of Whiteness initially did not think that they paid much attention to race. Some of the women interviewed claimed that they had never thought about a racial hierarchy or that they themselves belonged to a particular race; however, as the interviews progressed the participants revealed that they belonged to distinct cultural backgrounds. Frankenberg highlights the difference between "race-cognizant" and "color-blinded" interviewees, stating that in order for participants to examine race they had to step outside of conventional norms and acknowledge difference, which was not considered acceptable by Liberal norms. In particular, Frankenberg examined the ways in which women belonging to the Ashkenazi Jewish community experience a sense of cultural belonging, but do not consider their Jewish faith to be classified a formal "race". According to Frankenberg, this indicates that the interviewee considers race to have a certain biological basis. Frankenberg's work in White Women, Race Matters centralizes around this discussion of what constitutes difference between people and how interviewees define themselves as belonging to a specific culture or race.

She died in Bangalore, India, 22 April 2007 of cancer.
