= Sojourner Truth Organization =

U.S. new communist organization

- Abbreviation: STO
- Notable members: Noel Ignatiev; Don Hamerquist
- Founded: December 1969
- Dissolved: 1985
- Headquarters: Chicago
- Newspaper: Urgent Tasks; Workplace Papers
- Ideology: Anti-racism; Autonomist Marxism (Johnson–Forest Tendency); Revolutionary socialism New Communism; Anti-Stalinism; Anti-imperialism
- Political position: Far-left

Sojourner Truth Organization was a new communist group formed in the winter of 1969, prominent in the Midwest through 1985. Oriented towards organization in the workplace, and named after African American activist Sojourner Truth, the organization distinguished itself from other New Left groups in its critical approach to the role of race in the formation of the American working class.

== History and ideology ==
Noel Ignatiev, a former leader of the Students for a Democratic Society, became a prominent member of the STO, and expressed the group's sentiment:

in modern industrial societies, bourgeois rule depends on the development of a variety of "systems" that channel the outbreaks of the exploited class and allow their absorption by capital; that the specifically American framework for this process is the white-skin privilege system — the conferring of a favored status on the white sector of the proletariat; and that the trade unions cannot be understood apart from this framework.

Ignatiev would later contribute to the formulation of critical race theory, and edit Race Traitor magazine.

According to historian Michael Staudenmaier, "The Sojourner Truth Organization was founded in Chicago at the end of 1969, partly by people who had been involved with the RYM II faction of the recently crumbled SDS. The group largely turned its back on the student milieu, and instead focused its efforts on what has been variously called "industrial concentration" or "(point of) production work." This focus dominated the group's first several years, until the mid-1970s. During this time, the bulk of the membership (close to 50 people at some points) was employed full-time in a variety of factories throughout the Chicago area. In this context, the group agitated for what it called mass revolutionary independent workers' organizations, built alliances with black and Latino revolutionaries in workplaces, and struggled around a variety of campaigns that reflected the group's strategic orientation of placing the struggle against white supremacy front and center. Since STO was the first post-new left group in Chicago to emphasize production work, it was able to tap into and relate to a strikingly broad range of workplace struggles, wildcat strikes, and independent organizing efforts. Some of the best stories told by former members focus on these experiences. Still, the failure to build any sort of lasting momentum (much less a mass organization) caused STO to reflect critically on the limitations of industrial concentration as the group had practiced it throughout the early 1970s.

"A combination of objective conditions (deindustrialization and the decline of factory militance, which STO referred to as "the lull," complete with references to the period in Russian history between 1905 and 1917) and a series of debilitating splits and resignations accelerated the move away from production work in the mid-1970s. Around this same time, STO began to solidify ties with like-minded revolutionaries in other parts of the county, and by 1976 the group had reconstituted itself as an organization aiming to establish a national presence, merging with similar groups in Kansas City and Iowa. In the same period, the organization began to emphasize both the theory and the practice of anti-imperialism, participating in solidarity efforts around issues ranging from Puerto Rican independence to the liberation of Iran from the Shah. Depending on who you talk with, this shift was either 1) a sensible re-positioning of the group consistent with its founding aims of combating white supremacy and struggling for workers' power, or 2) an unfortunate retreat from the initial commitment to workplace struggles and a mistaken capitulation to the unconditional-support-for-national-liberation politics associated with the Weather Underground and the Prairie Fire Organizing Committee (PFOC). In any event, this framework guided the group's expansion throughout the late 1970s and into the early 1980s, when an STO presence (or at the very least, influence) could be found in places like San Francisco, Portland, Denver, New Orleans, and New York. By the turn of the 1980s, STO had begun to rethink its focus on anti-imperialism, partly due to ongoing political differences with the Stalinist tendencies of the most radical national liberation movements, and partly due to the growing influence inside the group of ideas associated with the autonomist Marxism then current in Europe. While entering what one former member refers to as the group's "dotage," STO began to emphasize the need to intervene in various social movements in ways that could further a vision of autonomy and mass direct action outside the bounds of loyal opposition to capitalism. In practice, this meant greater participation in anti-fascist, anti-nuclear and anti-militarization struggles, an abortive attempt to re-invigorate point-of-production organizing, and a growing awareness of the quasi-anarchist critique of pretensions to vanguard party status. Ideological and strategic differences over the new direction, and the failure to gain much traction in the new areas of work, led to significant attrition in the "periphery" of the group outside Chicago. By the end of 1983, the group had shrunk irrevocably back to its Chicago-specific origins and shifted its focus almost entirely to direct action, emphasizing mass illegality, in a variety of then-current social movements. Sometime thereafter, the group quietly disintegrated without much formal process, going out with a whimper instead of a bang."
