= Rich Benjamin =

American cultural critic, anthropologist, and author

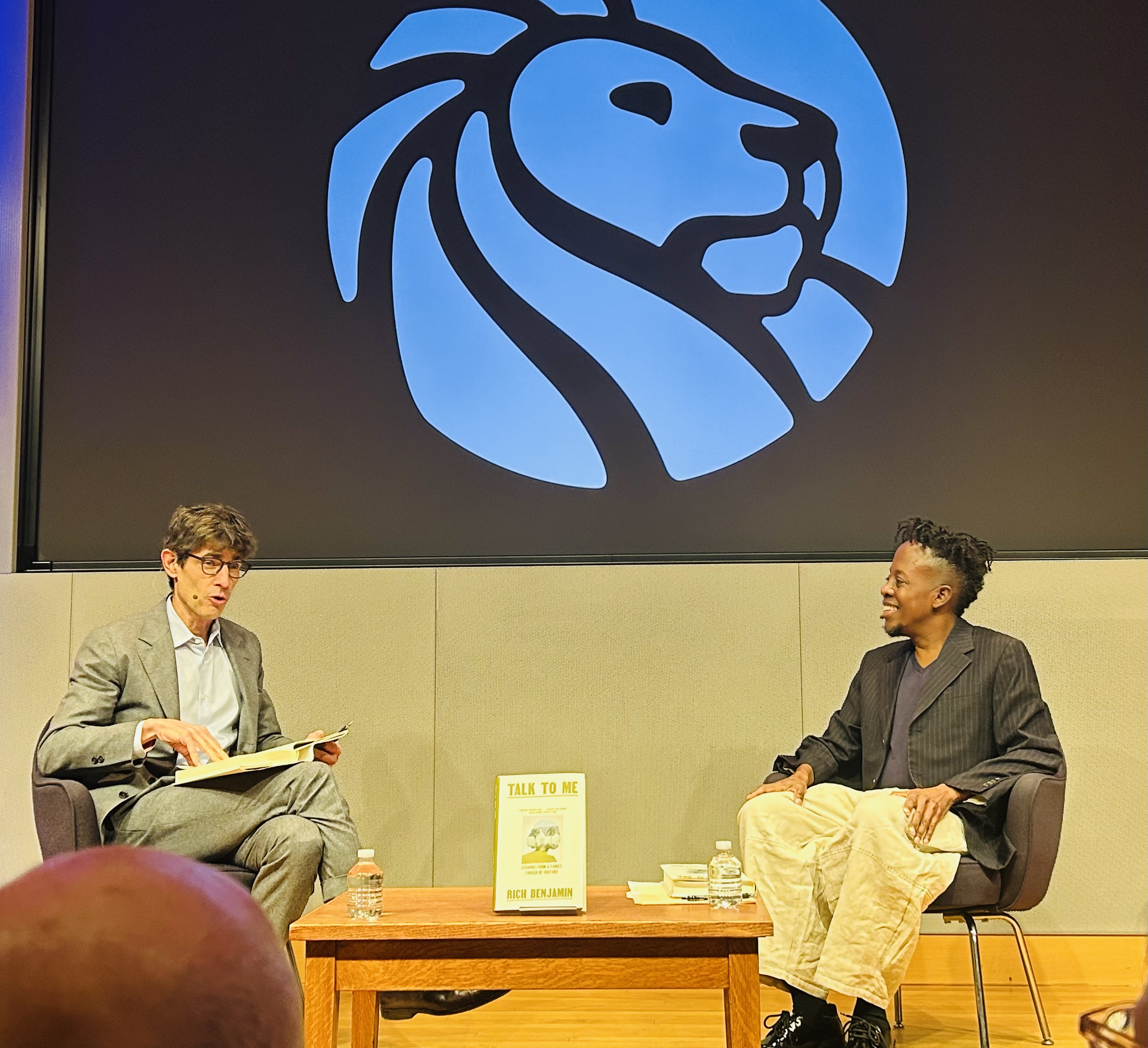
- Rich Benjamin (right) discussing his book Talk to Me with Nicholas Thompson, New York Public Library, February 2025
- Born: New York City, New York, U.S.
- Education: Wesleyan University (BA); Stanford University (PhD)
- Occupations: Author, television commentator, cultural critic
- Known for: Searching for Whitopia
- Website: richbenjamin.com

Rich Benjamin is an American cultural critic, anthropologist, and author. Benjamin is known as an author, lecturer and a public intellectual, who has discussed issues on NPR, PBS, CNN and MSNBC. His writing appears in The New York Times, The New Yorker, The Guardian and The New York Review of Books.

== Career ==
Benjamin's work focuses on United States politics and culture, democracy, money, high finance, class, Artificial Intelligence, public policy, global cultural transformation, and demographic change.

Benjamin has been contributing essays to The New Yorker since 2017.

Benjamin's book, Searching for Whitopia, was the subject of a TED Talk that has been viewed more than 2.8 million times and been translated into 25 languages. The book has received coverage on NPR and MS NOW.

His scholarly research has received funding from the Rockefeller Foundation, the Ford Foundation, the Russell Sage Foundation, Brown University, and the National Endowment for the Humanities. In addition, Benjamin became a Fellow in the literary arts at the Bellagio Center, Rockefeller Foundation in 2020.

In 2021 Benjamin delivered the Poynter Lecture at Yale Law School on "conservatism and Trumpism in the era of digital media—on how right-wing ideology, white fear, and the digital media ecosystem threaten democracy in America."

He serves on the Board of the Authors Guild, the largest, oldest union of writers in the US that fights for authors’ rights, their commercial interests, and free speech.

He has presented his research on money, blockchain, and decentralization at a conference on technology.

In 2021, he served as a Fellow at the Cullman Center for Scholars and Writers at the New York Public Library.

Benjamin was in Princeton, NJ in 2023 for his research and teaching post as the Anschutz Distinguished Fellow in American Studies at Princeton University.

In 2023-2024, Benjamin served as a Harvard-Radcliffe Fellow at the Institute for Advanced Study at Harvard University. There he continued research on his major field of interest, high finance—the social-scientific dimensions of quants, flash trading, hedge funds, extreme wealth, and risk.

== Works ==
=== Searching For Whitopia ===
Benjamin is the author of two major nonfiction books and numerous essays, reviews, and opinion pieces across prominent U.S. publications. According to a 2016 interview, Benjamin garnered information for Searching for Whitopia through immersive, firsthand research and quantitative data. During his research, he lived in several predominantly white, fast-growing communities, where he engaged residents everyday through activities like golf, poker, zoning meetings, and county town halls. The book is noted for its early exploration of exurban growth, white racial anxiety, and political polarization. The book earned Editors’ Choice distinctions from Booklist and the American Library Association.

=== Talk to Me ===
In 2025, Pantheon Books published Benjamin’s second major book, Talk to Me: Lessons from a Family Forged by History, a family memoir received “not only as a portrait of his family, but as a bold, pugnacious portrait of America.” The book drew significant critical acclaim, including starred reviews from Publishers Weekly, Kirkus Reviews, and BookPage. The book debuted with interviews of Benjamin on NPR’s Fresh Air with Terry Gross, MSNBC’s The Beat with Ari Melber, Brené Brown, and BBC World Service. Talk to Me blends archival research, political history, cultural criticism, and personal narrative reflecting Benjamin’s broader body of work on American identity and democracy.

Talk to Me was named a "Best Book of 2025" by Kirkus Reviews.

In Spring of 2026 it was announced that Talk to Me was named the Finalist for the prestigious J. Anthony Lukas Book Prize, awarded jointly by the Columbia University School of Journalism and the Nieman Foundation at Harvard University. “The prize honors works of nonfiction that combine literary grace, serious research, and original reporting,” the committee noted. “This year's finalist was selected from 473 entries by panels drawn from journalism, publishing, and academia.”

In its citation, the J. Anthony Lukas Book Prize called Talk to Me “a powerful saga… Through it all, Benjamin has skillfully woven an engrossing tale that is simultaneously intimate and global, harrowing and empowering.”

== Education ==
As a doctoral student at Stanford University, Benjamin studied with Professors Tim Lenoir and Terry Winograd, an adviser to the founders of Google. Benjamin received his BA from Wesleyan University in Government and Literature and his PhD from Stanford University in Modern Thought and Literature.
