= How the Irish Became White =

Non fiction book by Noel Ignatiev

How the Irish Became White is a nonfiction book by Noel Ignatiev, first published by Routledge in 1995. The book is based on Ignatiev's PhD thesis at Harvard University.

Considered a cultural-studies classic by many historians of racial and ethnic history, How the Irish Became White traces the Irish immigrant experience in the United States: starting as outcasts from the white Protestant majority in the 19th century only to become enthusiastic proponents of America's racist society.

When asked why he wrote the book, he explained:

The country is divided into masters and slaves. A big political problem is that many of the slaves think they are masters, or at least side with the masters at crucial moments—because they think they are white. I wanted to understand why the Irish, coming from conditions about as bad as could be imagined and thrown into low positions when they arrived, came to side with the oppressor rather than with the oppressed. Imagine how history might have been different had the Irish, the unskilled labor force of the north, and the slaves, the unskilled labor force of the South, been unified. I hoped that understanding why that didn’t happen in the past might open up new possibilities next time.

How the Irish Became White found an immediate audience. Mumia Abu-Jamal, the radio personality serving a life sentence in the murder of Daniel Faulkner, an Irish-American Philadelphia police officer, wrote a blurb for the book: "I learned a great deal about Philadelphia history--re: Irish anti-black history. It has its resonance in police-black relations; and one can see May 13th an historical echo of the torching of abolition and Black Masonic buildings a century before and its subsequent (instant and historic) whitewash. ... It provides a powerful historical perspective from which to view the City of Brotherly Love."

In 2020, Columbia University held a panel discussion on the book, which included the scholars Ira Katznelson, Rebecca A. Kobrin, and Timothy Patrick McCarthy, hosted by the documentarian June Cross.
