= The History of White People =

Book by Nell Irvin Painter

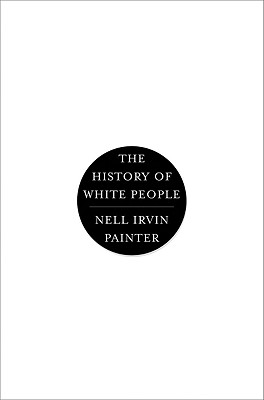
- Cover of the first edition
- Author: Nell Irvin Painter
- Language: English
- Published: 2010
- Publisher: W. W. Norton & Company
- Publication place: United States
- Media type: Print (hardcover)
- Pages: 496
- ISBN: 978-0393049343

The History of White People is a 2010 book by Nell Irvin Painter, in which the author explores the idea of whiteness throughout history, beginning with ancient Greece and continuing through the beginning of scientific racism in early modern Europe to 19th- through 21st-century America.

== Overview ==
The book describes attitudes toward and definitions of race among Europeans, and particularly Americans of European descent. The author says the idea of race is not just a matter of biology but also includes "concepts of labor, gender, class, and images of personal beauty".

The earliest European societies, including the Greeks and Romans, had no concept of race and classified people by ethnicity and social class, with the lowest class being slaves. Throughout most of European history, slaves were generally of European origin, often from conquered countries. From the fifth to the eleventh century the Vikings were especially prolific slavers, capturing and selling the inhabitants wherever they went. It was only in relatively modern times that slavery became associated with race. In 1790, U.S. citizens were defined as "free white men"; this excluded white men who were indentured servants. By the mid 19th century in America, white people (as then defined) were all free; slaves were of African or part-African descent.

When writers and scientists began to explore the concept of race, they focused on Europe, describing three or four different races among Europeans. Much of the classification was done by head shape and skull measurements, as well as height and skin pigmentation. The most attractive and most admirable race was that found in northwestern Europe, while the inhabitants of eastern and southern Europe were classified as lower races. The categorizing of different European races had legal and social effects in the United States, where 19th century immigrants from less favored areas such as Ireland, Italy, and Iberia were treated as less than fully "white" for legal and social purposes.

During the 19th and early 20th centuries in the United States, discussion of race often included a belief in the permanent superiority of one racial group over others, and a fear of the loss of racial purity. Intelligence testing was widely used as a means of ranking various races and ethnicities; this led to immigration laws that encouraged immigration from the presumably most desirable racial and ethnic groups while discouraging or forbidding others. Ralph Waldo Emerson was an influential figure in promoting some of these racial theories. Eugenics became a widely discussed issue and was embraced to some extent by many prominent people including Theodore Roosevelt and David Starr Jordan. Eugenics proponents urged higher reproductive rates among the most desirable population and sometimes sterilization of the less desirable elements.

The author traces four consecutive "enlargements of American whiteness" by which Irish, Italians, Jews, Hispanics, and other discriminated-against ethnicities gradually became fully accepted into white society. The passage of the Civil Rights Act of 1964 eliminated legal discrimination by race. As of the book's publication date, 2010, mixed-race people were more common and were becoming integrated: "The dark of skin who happen to be rich ... and the light of skin from any (racial background) who are beautiful, are now well on their way to inclusion." The author concludes that race has not disappeared from American society – "the fundamental black/white binary endures" – but the "category of whiteness – or we might say more precisely, a category of nonblackness – effectively expands."

== Reception ==
The book was a New York Times best seller. Professor of English Paul Devlin, writing in the San Francisco Chronicle, said the book "is perhaps the definitive story of a most curious adjective. It is a scholarly, non-polemical masterpiece of broad historical synthesis, combining political, scientific, economic and cultural history." Historian Linda Gordon, writing in The New York Times, says the book "has much to teach everyone, including whiteness experts, but it is accessible and breezy, its coverage broad and therefore necessarily superficial." She adds that she wishes she had had this book, "an insightful and lively exposition", to help her teach undergraduate students about race theory. Editor Thomas Rogers in Salon calls it an "exhaustive and fascinating new look at the history of the idea of the white race". Historian J.R. McNeill in Population and Development Review praised Neill's "grasp of American history and culture", but criticized "her forays into ancient history or modern science", giving as an example for the latter her "ill-advised remarks on the future of natural selection and skin color".

In January 2019, it was translated into French as Histoire des Blancs.

== Sources ==
- Painter, Nell Irvin (2010). The History of White People. W. W. Norton & Company. ISBN 978-0-393-04934-3.
