= Searching for Whitopia =

Book by Rich Benjamin

Searching for Whitopia: An Improbable Journey to the Heart of White America
- Softcover edition
- Author: Rich Benjamin
- Language: English
- Subject: Race and ethnicity in the United States, white flight
- Genre: Non-fiction
- Publisher: Hyperion Books
- Publication date: October 6, 2009
- Publication place: United States
- Media type: Print, e-book
- Pages: 354 pages
- ISBN: 978-1401322687

Searching for Whitopia: An Improbable Journey to the Heart of White America is a 2009 non-fiction book by Rich Benjamin.

In May 2010, Benjamin briefly summarized his experiences in a TED talk.

== Overview ==
African American journalist Rich Benjamin documents his journeys to find out why more and more white Americans move to small towns and areas that are, for the most part, white, and to explain why Whitopias are growing and what it means for the United States.

Benjamin mounted a two-year tour of the United States, covering 26,907 miles (43,303 km), looking for "Whitopias", which he defined as:

- An area which has experienced at least 6% growth rate since 2000
- The great majority of that growth consists of white people
- The area has a pleasant look, feel, ambiance or charm

Benjamin spent several months in three such areas: St. George, Utah, Coeur d'Alene, Idaho, and Forsyth County, Georgia. In each case, he generated a master plan to thoroughly immerse himself in the community's core, with lists of the power brokers, the important groups, and the significant events. He tried to volunteer or involve himself with those people and groups.

== Author's experiences ==
In St. George, Benjamin rented a house over the telephone in a gated community, La Entrada.

He took up golfing, fishing and Texas hold 'em. He was generally welcomed in every instance, and learned that the dominant topic in St. George was illegal immigration; a local group had been organized to fight immigration, and they held regular rallies.

In Idaho, Benjamin rented a resort cabin at Lake Coeur d'Alene. He found a significant number of retired LAPD officers living there, and also found a significant number of gun owners where he learned to shoot a pistol at the local gun range.

He spent time at a retreat, the only non-white journalist in the group, at the Council of Aryan Nations compound. He was told that the group is not "white-supremacy"; they are "white-segregation" - they merely don't want to live in close proximity to non-white people. He noted the preponderance of Confederate flags.

In Georgia he found the predominant cultural activity revolved around a mega-church, so he involved himself in its activities. He felt the most comfortable in this situation, since both blacks and whites in this area are used to seeing the other - as contrasted to the first two sites, where a black person is still a rarity.

== Aftermath ==
In an October 2009 interview by Time magazine following Whitetopia's publication, author Rich Benjamin was asked about the danger Whitopias pose to America as a whole, to which Benjamin answered "You can call me old-fashioned, but I’m an integrationist. A democracy can’t function at its optimum unless all members are integrated as full members."

== See also ==
- White flight
