= Ross, North Dakota =

- City
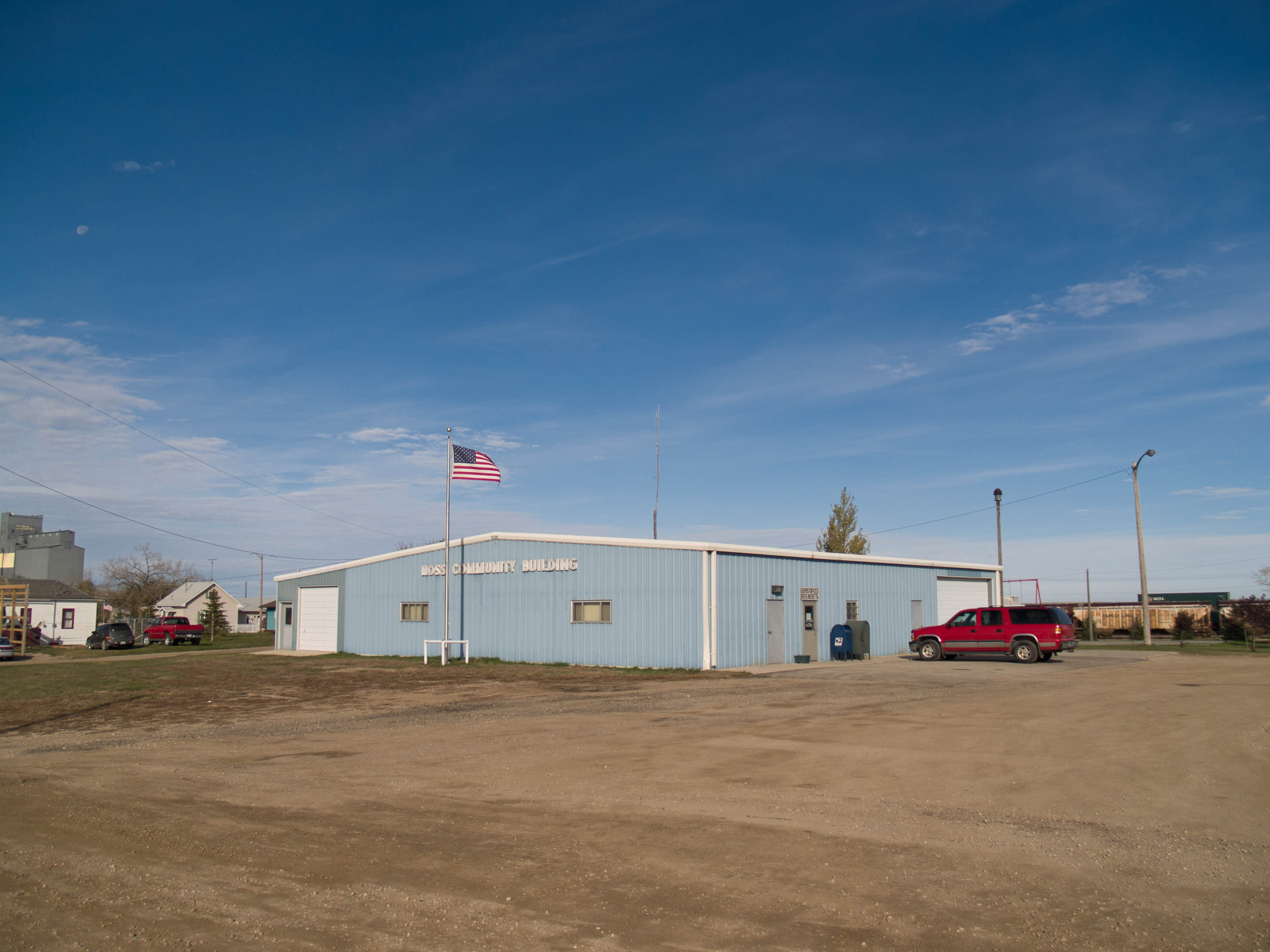
- Community Building in Ross
- Interactive map of Ross, North Dakota
- Location within North Dakota
- Coordinates: 48.3128°N 102.5435°W
- Country: United States
- State: North Dakota
- County: Mountrail
- Founded: 1902
- Established: 1929

Government
  - Mayor: Wyatt Seibel

Area
  - Total: 0.288 sq mi (0.745 km^{2})
  - Land: 0.288 sq mi (0.745 km^{2})
  - Water: 0 sq mi (0.000 km^{2}) 0.00%
- Elevation: 2,300 ft (700 m)

Population (2020)
  - Total: 95
  - Estimate (2025): 96
  - Density: 330/sq mi (130/km^{2})
- Time zone: UTC–6 (Central (CST))
  - Summer (DST): UTC–5 (CDT)
- ZIP Code: 58776
- Area code: 701
- FIPS code: 38-68540
- GNIS feature ID: 1036245

Ross is a city in Mountrail County, North Dakota, United States. The population was 95 as of the 2020 census, and was estimated at 96 in 2025.

== History ==
Ross was founded in 1902. It was the site of one of the oldest mosques in the United States, formed by Muslim homesteaders. Established in 1929, the mosque fell into disrepair and was dismantled. In 2005, the edifice was rebuilt by the family of one of the last remaining Muslims in the area. The community that built the mosque were Syrian-Lebanese immigrants who settled the region starting in the late 19th century to take advantage of the Homestead Act. The mosque was featured on NPR's Weekend Edition on September 12, 2010.

== Geography ==
According to the United States Census Bureau, the city has a total area of 0.288 square miles (0.75 km^{2}), all land.

== Demographics ==
Historical population
Census	Pop.	Note	%±
1960	167		—
1970	125		−25.1%
1980	104		−16.8%
1990	61		−41.3%
2000	48		−21.3%
2010	97		102.1%
2020	95		−2.1%
2025 (est.)	96		1.1%
U.S. Decennial Census; 2020 Census

=== 2020 census ===
As of the 2020 census, there were 95 people, 42 households, and 23 families residing in the city.

=== 2010 census ===
As of the 2010 census, there were 97 people, 46 households, and 23 families residing in the city. The population density was 346.4 inhabitants per square mile (133.7/km^{2}). There were 54 housing units at an average density of 192.9 per square mile (74.5/km^{2}). The racial makeup of the city was 94.8% White, 4.1% Native American, and 1.0% from two or more races. Hispanic or Latino people of any race were 2.1% of the population.

There were 46 households, of which 17.4% had children under the age of 18 living with them, 43.5% were married couples living together, 6.5% had a male householder with no wife present, and 50.0% were non-families. 34.8% of all households were made up of individuals, and 4.3% had someone living alone who was 65 years of age or older. The average household size was 2.11 and the average family size was 2.57.

The median age in the city was 36.5 years. 15.5% of residents were under the age of 18; 13.3% were between the ages of 18 and 24; 30.9% were from 25 to 44; 34.1% were from 45 to 64; and 6.2% were 65 years of age or older. The gender makeup of the city was 59.8% male and 40.2% female.

=== 2000 census ===
As of the 2000 census, there were 48 people, 24 households, and 13 families residing in the city. The population density was 169.6 inhabitants per square mile (65.5/km^{2}). There were 29 housing units at an average density of 102.5 per square mile (39.6/km^{2}). The racial makeup of the city was 97.92% White and 2.08% Native American.

There were 24 households, out of which 20.8% had children under the age of 18 living with them, 50.0% were married couples living together, 4.2% had a female householder with no husband present, and 45.8% were non-families. 41.7% of all households were made up of individuals, and 12.5% had someone living alone who was 65 years of age or older. The average household size was 2.00 and the average family size was 2.62.

In the city, the population was spread out, with 14.6% under the age of 18, 14.6% from 18 to 24, 22.9% from 25 to 44, 27.1% from 45 to 64, and 20.8% who were 65 years of age or older. The median age was 44 years. For every 100 females, there were 92.0 males. For every 100 females age 18 and over, there were 105.0 males.

The median income for a household in the city was $18,750, and the median income for a family was $28,750. Males had a median income of $16,875 versus $14,250 for females. The per capita income for the city was $15,025. There were no families and 5.3% of the population living below the poverty line, including no under eighteens and none of those over 64.

== Transportation ==
Amtrak's Empire Builder, which operates between Seattle/Portland and Chicago, passes through the town on BNSF tracks, but makes no stop. The nearest station is located in Stanley, 7 miles (11 km) to the east.

== Education ==
The area is served by the Stanley Public School District. It operates the Stanley School. In the 2025-26 academic year, the district reported a total of 789 students.
