= Noel Ignatiev =

American author and historian (1940–2019)

- Born: Noel Saul Ignatin; December 27, 1940; Philadelphia, Pennsylvania, U.S.
- Died: November 9, 2019 (aged 78); Tucson, Arizona, U.S.
- Occupation: Author; historian

Academic background
- Education: University of Pennsylvania; Harvard University (MA, PhD)
- Thesis: How the Irish Became White (1995)

Academic work
- Institutions: Massachusetts College of Art; Harvard University
- Main interests: Race; whiteness

Noel Ignatiev (/ɪɡˈnætiɛv/; born Noel Saul Ignatin; December 27, 1940 – November 9, 2019) was an American author and historian. He was best known for his controversial theories on race and for his call to abolish "whiteness". Ignatiev was the co-founder of the New Abolitionist Society and co-editor of the journal Race Traitor, which promoted the idea that "treason to whiteness is loyalty to humanity". In 1995 he published the book, How the Irish Became White, an examination of the choices made by early Irish Immigrants to the United States, many of whom, when faced with xenophobia and a history of being oppressed themselves, proceeded to take the opportunity to increase their power in society by identifying as "white" and participating in oppressing darker-skinned peoples.

== Early life and career ==
Ignatiev was born Noel Saul Ignatin in Philadelphia, the son of Carrie, a homemaker, and Irv Ignatin, who delivered newspapers. His family's original surname, Ignatiev, was changed to Ignatin and later back to the original spelling. He was Jewish. His grandparents were from Russia. Ignatiev's parents later ran a housewares store. He attended the University of Pennsylvania, but dropped out after three years.

Under the name Noel Ignatin, he joined the Communist Party USA in January 1958, at the age of 17, but in August left (along with Theodore W. Allen and Harry Haywood) to help form the Provisional Organizing Committee to Reconstitute the Marxist–Leninist Communist Party (POC). He was expelled from the POC in 1966.

In 1969 Ignatiev became a member of the National Interim Council in the Students for a Democratic Society. When that organization fractured, he became part of the group Sojourner Truth Organization (STO) in 1970. The STO and Ignatiev were heavily influenced in this period by the ideas of Trinidadian writer C. L. R. James.

For twenty years, Ignatiev worked in a Gary, Indiana steel mill and also in the manufacturing of farming equipment and electrical components. A Marxist activist, he was involved in efforts by African American steel workers to achieve equality in the mills. In 1984, he was laid off from the steel mill, approximately a year after an arrest on charges of attacking a strike-breaker's car with a paint bomb.

== Academic career ==
Ignatiev set up Marxist discussion groups in the early 1980s. In 1985, Ignatiev was accepted to the Harvard Graduate School of Education without an undergraduate degree. After earning his master's degree, he joined the Harvard faculty as a lecturer and worked toward a doctorate in U.S. history.

Ignatiev was a graduate student at Harvard University where he earned his Ph.D. in 1995. He taught courses there before moving to the Massachusetts College of Art. His academic work was linked to his call to "abolish" the white race, a controversial slogan whose meaning is not always agreed upon by those who debate his work. His dissertation, published by Routledge as the book How the Irish Became White, was advised by prominent social historian of American race and ethnicity Stephan Thernstrom and by Alan Heimert. Ignatiev was the co-founder and co-editor of the journal Race Traitor and the New Abolitionist Society.

== Ideas and controversies ==
=== Views on race ===
Ignatiev viewed race distinctions and race itself as a social construct, not a scientific reality.

Ignatiev's study of Irish immigrants in the 19th-century United States argued that an Irish triumph over nativism marks the incorporation of the Irish into the dominant group of American society. Ignatiev asserted that the Irish were not initially accepted as white by the dominant Anglo-American population. He claimed that only through their own violence against free blacks and support of slavery did the Irish gain acceptance as white. Ignatiev defined whiteness as the access to white privilege, which according to Ignatiev gains people perceived to have "white" skin admission to certain neighborhoods, schools, and jobs. In the 19th century, whiteness was strongly associated with political power, especially suffrage. Ignatiev's book on Irish immigrants has been criticized for "conflat[ing] race and economic position" and for ignoring data that contradicts his theses.

Ignatiev stated that attempts to give race a biological foundation have only led to absurdities as in the common example that a white woman could give birth to a black child, but a black woman could never give birth to a white child. Ignatiev asserted that the only logical explanation for this notion is that people are members of different racial categories because society assigns people to these categories.

=== "New abolition" and the "white race" ===
Ignatiev's web site and publication Race Traitor displayed the motto "treason to whiteness is loyalty to humanity". In response to a letter to the site which understood the motto as meaning that the authors "hated" white people because of their "white skin", Ignatiev and the other editors responded:

We do not hate you or anyone else for the color of her skin. What we hate is a system that confers privileges (and burdens) on people because of their color. It is not fair skin that makes people white; it is fair skin in a certain kind of society, one that attaches social importance to skin color. When we say we want to abolish the white race, we do not mean we want to exterminate people with fair skin. We mean that we want to do away with the social meaning of skin color, thereby abolishing the white race as a social category. Consider this parallel: To be against royalty does not mean wanting to kill the king. It means wanting to do away with crowns, thrones, titles, and the privileges attached to them. In our view, whiteness has a lot in common with royalty: they are both social formations that carry unearned advantages.

In September 2002, Harvard Magazine published an excerpt from When Race Becomes Real: Black and White Writers Confront Their Personal Histories, edited by Bernestine Singley, about Ignatiev's role in launching Race Traitor. In the excerpt, Ignatiev wrote that "the goal of abolishing the white race is on its face so desirable that some may find it hard to believe that it could incur any opposition other than from committed white supremacists". He wrote that the magazine's editors were frequently accused of being racists or part of a hate group, to which his "standard response" was "to draw an analogy with anti-royalism: to oppose monarchy does not mean killing the king; it means getting rid of crowns, thrones, royal titles, etc." Ignatiev also wrote that "the editors meant it when they replied to a reader, 'Make no mistake about it: we intend to keep bashing the dead white males, and the live ones, and the females too, until the social construct known as "the white race" is destroyed—not "deconstructed" but destroyed'".

Some critics, particularly David Horowitz, saw the excerpt as an example of institutional racism against white people at Harvard, in progressive culture, and in academia.

=== Toaster controversy ===
From 1986 until 1992, Ignatiev served as a tutor (academic adviser) for Dunster House at Harvard College. In early 1992, Ignatiev objected to the university's purchase of a toaster oven for the Dunster House dining hall that would be designated for kosher use only. He insisted that cooking utensils with restricted use should be paid for by private funds. In a letter to the Harvard student newspaper, the Harvard Crimson, Ignatiev wrote: "I regard anti-Semitism, like all forms of religious, ethnic and racial bigotry, as a crime against humanity and whoever calls me an anti-Semite will face a libel suit".

Dunster House subsequently declined to renew Ignatiev's contract, saying that his conduct during the dispute was "unbecoming of a Harvard tutor". Dunster co-master Hetty Liem said it was the job of a tutor "to foster a sense of community and tolerance and to serve as a role model for the students" and that Ignatiev had not done so.

=== Encyclopedia of Race and Racism ===
In 2008, the American Jewish Committee objected to an encyclopedia article on Zionism that Ignatiev wrote for The Encyclopedia of Race and Racism. In the article, Ignatiev described Israel as a "racial state, where rights are assigned on the basis of ascribed descent or the approval of the superior race" and likened it to Nazi Germany and the Southern United States before the civil rights movement. The American Jewish Committee questioned why the encyclopedia included an entry about Zionism, stating that it was the only nationalist movement with an article in the encyclopedia.

Subsequently, the encyclopedia's publisher Gale announced the appointment of an independent committee to investigate "the factual accuracy, scholarly basis, coverage, scope, and balance of every article". In addition, Gale published a 10-part composite article, "Nationalism and Ethnicity", with a new article on Zionism and evaluations of cultural nationalism across the globe. In response to the findings of the independent committee, Gale eliminated Ignatiev's article from the encyclopedia.

== Death ==
Ignatiev spoke at a bar in Brooklyn, New York, on October 27, 2019, at the launch party for an issue of the journal Hard Crackers, which he edited. Soon after, he flew to Arizona to be with members of his family. On November 9, Ignatiev died at Banner University Medical Center Tucson at the age of 78.

== Bibliography ==
- — (1993). "'The American blindspot': Reconstruction according to Eric Foner and W.E.B. Du Bois" (PDF). Labour / Le Travail. 31: 243–251. doi:10.2307/25143676.
- — (Summer 1994). "The revolution as an African-American exuberance". Eighteenth-Century Studies. 27 (4): 605–613. doi:10.2307/2739442.
- — (1995). How the Irish became white. New York: Burns & Oates. ISBN 978-0-415-91384-3.
- Ignatiev, Noel; Garvey, John, eds. (1996). Race Traitor. New York: Psychology Press. ISBN 978-0-415-91392-8. (anthology of articles from the magazine by the same name)
- — (May 2004). "Zionism, Antisemitism, and the People of Palestine". RaceTraitor.org. Dorchester, Massachusetts: Race Traitor. Archived from the original on June 3, 2004. Republished as — (October 15, 2023). "Zionism, Antisemitism, and the People of Palestine". HardCrackers.com. Brooklyn: Hard Crackers.

== See also ==
- Frederick Douglass and the White Negro (Ignatiev is a major contributor)
- Race traitor
- Whiteness studies
