= Eric Arnesen =

American historian (born 1958)

- Born: April 30, 1958 (age 68)

Academic background
- Education: Wesleyan University; Yale University

Academic work
- Discipline: Historian
- Sub-discipline: Modern American labor history
- Institutions: George Washington University
- Main interests: African American labor history
- Website: history.columbian.gwu.edu/eric-arnesen

Eric Arnesen (born 30 April 1958) is an American historian. He is currently the James R. Hoffa Professor of Modern American Labor History at George Washington University. He was a Fulbright Scholar, and is a member of the Organization of American Historians.

== Life ==
Arnesen completed his BA degree from Wesleyan University in 1980. He completed his MA in Afro-American Studies from Yale University in 1984. He received his Ph.D. in History from Yale University in 1986.

== Selected publications ==
=== Articles ===
- "'Like Banquo's Ghost, It Will Not Down': The Race Question and the American Railroad Brotherhoods, 1880-1920". The American Historical Review. 99 (5): 1601–1633. December 1994. doi:10.2307/2168390.
- "Whiteness and the Historians' Imagination". International Labor and Working-Class History. 60: 3–32. October 2001. doi:10.1017/S0147547901004380.
- "Specter of the Black Strikebreaker: Race, Employment, and Labor Activism in the Industrial Era". Labor History. 44 (3): 319–335. August 2003. doi:10.1080/002365603200012946.
- "Reconsidering the 'Long Civil Rights Movement'". Historically Speaking. 10 (2): 31–34. April 2009. doi:10.1353/hsp.0.0025.
- "Civil Rights and the Cold War At Home: Postwar Activism, Anticommunism, and the Decline of the Left". American Communist History. 11 (1): 5–44. April 2012. doi:10.1080/14743892.2012.665246.
- "The Final Conflict? On the Scholarship of Civil Rights, the Left and the Cold War". American Communist History. 11 (1): 63–80. April 2012. doi:10.1080/14743892.2012.664888.

=== Books ===
==== Author ====
- Waterfront Workers of New Orleans: Race, Class, and Politics, 1863–1923. Urbana: University of Illinois Press, 1994. ISBN 9780252063770.
- Brotherhoods of Color: Black Railroad Workers and the Struggle for Equality. London: Harvard University Press, 2002. ISBN 9780674008175.
- Black Protest and the Great Migration: A Brief History with Documents. Bedford/St. Martin's, 2003. ISBN 9780312391294.
- The Human Tradition in American Labor History. Wilmington: SR Books, 2004. ISBN 9780842029872.
- The Black Worker: Race, Labor, and Civil Rights Since Emancipation. Urbana: University of Illinois Press, 2007. ISBN 9780252031458.

==== Editor ====
- Labor Histories: Class, Politics, and the Working-Class Experience. With Julie Greene and Bruce Laurie. University of Illinois Press, 1998. ISBN 978-0-252-06710-5.
- Encyclopedia of US Labor and Working-Class History. London: Routledge, 2006. ISBN 978-0-415-96826-3.
