= Nell Irvin Painter =

American historian (born 1942)

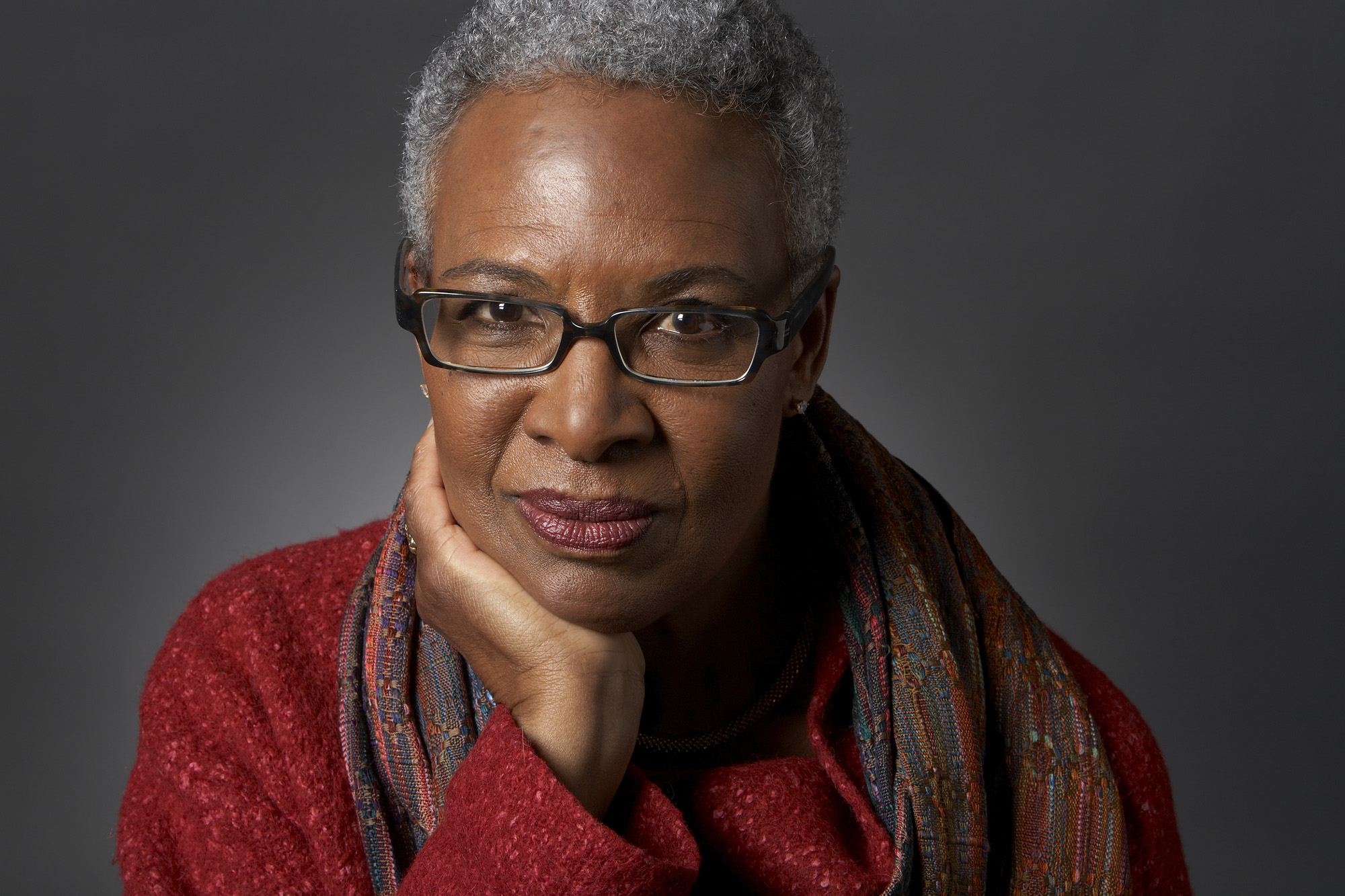
- Born: Nell Elizabeth Irvin; August 2, 1942 (age 84); Houston, Texas, U.S.
- Education: University of California at Berkeley; University of California at Los Angeles; Harvard University; Rhode Island School of Design
- Occupations: Historian; Author; Painter
- Employer: Princeton University (emerita)
- Known for: African American Literature; American History; American Slavery
- Spouse: Glenn Shafer
- Parents: Frank Irvin (father); Dona McGruder (mother)
- Website: www.nellpainter.com

Nell Irvin Painter (born Nell Elizabeth Irvin; August 2, 1942) is an American historian notable for her works on United States Southern history of the nineteenth century. She is retired from Princeton University as the Edwards Professor of American History Emerita. She has served as president of the Organization of American Historians and as president of the Southern Historical Association. She was appointed as chair of the MacDowell board of directors in 2020.

== Early life ==
She was born as Nell Irvin in Houston, Texas, to Dona Lolita (McGruder) Irvin and Frank Edward Irvin. Her mother held a degree from Houston College for Negroes (1937) and later, taught in the public schools of Oakland, California. Her father had to drop out of college in 1937 during the Great Depression. He eventually trained to become a laboratory technician. He had a long career at the University of California, Berkeley, where he trained many students in lab techniques. She had an older brother, Frank, who died young.

Her family moved to Oakland, California, when she was ten weeks old. They were part of the second wave of the Great Migration of millions of African Americans from the Deep South to urban centers; from the 1940s to 1970, many migrated to the West Coast for jobs related to the growing defense industry, especially in California. However, some of their relatives had been in California since the 1920s.

== Education ==
Painter attended the Oakland Public Schools, including Oakland Technical High School, from which she was graduated in 1959.

She earned her B.A. in anthropology from the University of California, Berkeley, in 1964. During her undergraduate years, she studied French medieval history at the University of Bordeaux, France, 1962–63. As a postgraduate, she studied abroad at the Institute of African Studies at the University of Ghana, 1965–66. In 1967, she completed an M.A. at the University of California, Los Angeles. In 1974, she earned an M.A. and her Ph.D. at Harvard University.

After her retirement from Princeton, Painter resumed her education with studies in yet another discipline, fine arts. She attended the Mason Gross School of the Arts at Rutgers University, where she earned a BFA in art in 2009. She next earned an MFA in painting from Rhode Island School of Design in 2011.

Her first memoir, Old in Art School, reflects on her experience as she pursued her art degrees.

== Career ==
After receiving her Ph.D. from Harvard University, Painter worked as an assistant professor and then an associate professor at the University of Pennsylvania. From 1980 to 1988, she was a professor of history at the University of North Carolina at Chapel Hill.

In 1988, she became a professor of history at Princeton University. During 1990–91, she was acting director of the Princeton University Program in Afro-American Studies. In 1991, she was named the Edwards Professor of American History there. From 1997 to 2000, she was director of the Program in African-American Studies. She served as a professor at Princeton until her retirement in 2005.

== Publications ==
External videos
- Interview with Painter on Sojourner Truth: A Life, A Symbol, December 8, 1996, C-SPAN Booknotes
- Presentation by Painter on Creating Black Americans, December 14, 2005, C-SPAN
- Presentation by Painter on The History of White People, March 23, 2010, C-SPAN
- Presentation by Painter on The History of White People, September 25, 2010, C-SPAN

As of 2024, Painter has written the following nine books. In addition, she has written many reviews, essays, and articles. Her 2020 essay that is entitled, My Corona Occupation, is about her experience with creating art and writing during the pandemic.

- Exodusters: Black Migration to Kansas After Reconstruction. Norton. 1976. ISBN 978-0-393-00951-4.
- Hudson, Hosea; Painter, Nell Irvin (1979). The Narrative of Hosea Hudson: His Life as a Negro Communist in the South. Harvard University Press. ISBN 978-0674601109.
- Standing at Armageddon: The United States, 1877–1919. W. W. Norton. 1989. ISBN 978-0-393-30588-3.
- Sojourner Truth: A Life, a Symbol. W.W. Norton. 1997. ISBN 978-0-393-31708-4.
- Southern History Across the Color Line. UNC Press Books. 2002. ISBN 978-0-8078-5360-3.
- Creating Black Americans: African-American History and Its Meanings, 1619 to the Present. Oxford University Press. 2005. ISBN 978-0-19-513755-2.
- The History of White People. W. W. Norton. 2010. ISBN 978-0-393-07949-4. A 'New York Times bestseller.
- Old in Art School: A Memoir of Starting Over. Counterpoint Press, 2018. ISBN 978-1640090613.
- I Just Keep Talking—A Life in Essays. Doubleday, 2024. ISBN 9780385548908.

In addition to her writing, Painter creates art revolving around the discrimination against African Americans. This work is displayed at annual art events she produces.

== Honors and recognition ==
Painter has received honorary degrees from Dartmouth College, Wesleyan University, Yale University, and other institutions. In 1986, she received a Candace Award from the National Coalition of 100 Black Women.

== Personal life ==
In 1989, Painter married mathematician and statistician Glenn Shafer. He is co-creator of the Dempster–Shafer theory, a mathematical framework to model epistemic uncertainty, and a former dean of the business school of Rutgers University.
