= Definitions of whiteness in the United States =

Legal and social structures that define and distinguish whites in the United States

Legal and social definitions of who is considered white in the United States have varied throughout the country’s history. In naturalization law, racial classifications historically determined whether an immigrant was eligible to acquire U.S. citizenship. The Naturalization Act of 1790 restricted naturalization to a “free white person.” Courts interpreted the statutory category of “white persons” differently across cases involving applicants of various backgrounds. In re Rodriguez (1897), a federal district court granted a Mexican applicant’s naturalization petition despite doubts about his classification under contemporary anthropological theories. In Ozawa v. United States (1922) and United States v. Bhagat Singh Thind (1923), the Supreme Court interpreted the statutory racial prerequisite (i.e., the category of “white persons”) in ways that excluded the Japanese and Indian applicants, respectively.

In 1870, Congress extended eligibility to persons of African nativity and African descent through Section 7 of the Naturalization Act of 1870 but retained racial restrictions on naturalization. These restrictions remained until the Immigration and Nationality Act of 1952, which removed racial barriers to naturalization.

== Background ==
The American Association of Biological Anthropologists describes racial groups in Western societies as socially, politically, and legally constructed and connects their development to racial hierarchies and power inequities. According to them, the Western concept of race developed alongside European colonial expansion and systems of slavery, exploitation, and discrimination. Scientists, including biological anthropologists, helped formulate and perpetuate racial classifications that purported to describe natural biological divisions. These categories do not accurately represent human biological variation, although they have had substantial social and legal consequences.

According to historian David Roediger, "white" had become well established as a racial term by the 19th century, when the enslavement of African Americans was widespread. Roediger argues that white workers constructed their "whiteness" in opposition to Black people as a means to help them garner psychological and social benefits, which helped compensate for the insecurity and dependency of wage labor.

The process of being officially defined as white by law often emerged in court disputes over citizenship. The Naturalization Act of 1790 offered naturalization only to "any alien, being a free white person".

Legal scholar Ian Haney López examines historical naturalization decisions as examples of how law constructs race. These were known as the “racial prerequisite cases”, which required courts to interpret racial categories embedded in federal citizenship law. According to López, courts reported 52 such cases between 1878 and 1952. These decisions addressed whether applicants met the racial requirements of naturalization, rather than providing a single, consistent definition of whiteness.

In United States v. Bhagat Singh Thind (1923), the Supreme Court held that the statutory phrase “free white persons” should be interpreted according to “common understanding” rather than technical ethnological classifications. Thus, courts had vindicated a "common knowledge" standard, concluding that "scientific evidence" was incoherent. Legal scholar John Tehranian argues that in reality this was a "performance-based" standard, relating to religious practices, culture, education, intermarriage, and a community's role in the US.

White American ancestries in 2000 (United States census)
Ancestry	Percentage
German	15.2
Irish	10.8
English	8.7
Italian	5.6
Polish	3.2
French	3.0
Scottish	1.7
Dutch	1.6
Norwegian	1.6
Scots-Irish	1.5
Swedish	1.4

The US Census Bureau collected Hispanic origin separately from race, allowing respondents to identify as both White and Hispanic. A Spanish-origin question appeared on the sample questionnaire in 1970; beginning in 1980, the question was asked of the entire population. In cases where individuals did not self-identify, the US census parameters for race gave each national origin a racial value.

The 1990 US census' Public Use Microdata Sample (PUMS) listed "Caucasian" and "Aryan," among other terms, as subgroups of "white" in its ancestry code listing, but 2005 and later PUMS codes do not. These were ancestry-response codes rather than separate categories in the census race question.

The 2000 US census states that racial categories "generally reflect a social definition of race recognized in this country. They do not conform to any biological, anthropological or genetic criteria". It defines "white people" as "people having origins in any of the original peoples of Europe, the Middle East, or North Africa". The Federal Bureau of Investigation uses the same definition. The definition actually does vary and is also published as "a light skinned race", which avoids inclusion of any sort of nationality or ethnicity.

In 2024, the Office of Management and Budget revised the federal standards to create a separate Middle Eastern or North African category and define White as having origins in Europe. The Census Bureau plans to implement the updated standards in the 2027 American Community Survey and the 2030 Census.

== Racial prerequisite cases ==
When only "white" people could become naturalized U.S. citizens, many court decisions defined which ethnic groups were included under this term in the "racial prerequisite cases", which informed subsequent legislation.

Naturalization Act of 1790

The Naturalization Act of 1790 established the first uniform federal rules for naturalization. It made a “free white person” eligible to naturalize by meeting residence, good character, and oath requirements supporting the Constitution. The racial requirement restricted access to citizenship through naturalization; it did not govern every means of acquiring citizenship.

Extension of Eligibility in 1870

Section 7 of the Naturalization Act of 1870 extended the naturalization laws to “aliens of African nativity and to persons of African descent.” The legislation expanded eligibility beyond white applicants but did not establish race-neutral naturalization. Applicants who did not fit the eligible statutory categories still faced racial barriers.

Judicial Interpretation

The statutes did not define who qualified as white, leaving courts to interpret and apply their own standards. Courts therefore considered applicants’ ancestry and appearance, contemporary ethnological classifications, common understandings of race, congressional intent, and prior judicial decisions. The resulting classifications differed across applicants and jurisdictions. The “scientific evidence” discussed in historical accounts of these cases refers to racial theories used by courts at the time, not to scientifically valid biological divisions of humanity.

In In re Ah Yup (1878), a federal court held that a Chinese applicant did not qualify as a white person under the naturalization statute. The decision became an important precedent in subsequent disputes over racial eligibility.

Overview of racial prerequisite cases
Case	Year	Holding	Rationales
In re Ah Yup	1878	Chinese are not White	Scientific evidence, common knowledge, congressional intent
In re Camille	1880	Persons half White and half Native American are not White	Legal precedent
In re Kanaka Nian	1889	Hawaiians are not White	Scientific evidence
In re Hong Yen Chang	1890	Chinese are not White	Legal precedent
In re Po	1894	Burmese are not White	Common knowledge, legal precedent
In re Saito	1894	Japanese are not White	Congressional intent, common knowledge, scientific evidence, legal precedent
In re Gee Hop	1895	Chinese are not White	Legal precedent, congressional intent
In re Rodriguez	1897	Mexicans are White	Legal precedent
In re Burton	1900	Native Americans are not White	No explanation
In re Yamashita	1902	Japanese are not White	Legal precedent
In re Buntaro Kumagai	1908	Japanese are not White	Congressional intent, legal precedent
In re Knight	1909	Persons half White, one-quarter Japanese, and one-quarter Chinese are not White	Legal precedent
In re Balsara	1909	Asian Indians are probably not White	Congressional intent
In re Najour	1909	Syrians are White	Historical background, scientific evidence
In re Halladjian	1909	Armenians are White	Scientific evidence, legal precedent
United States v. Dolla	1910	Asian Indians are White	Ocular inspection of skin (scientific evidence)
In re Mudarri	1910	Syrians are White	Scientific evidence, legal precedent
Bessho v. United States	1910	Japanese are not White	Congressional intent
In re Ellis	1910	Syrians are White	Common knowledge, congressional intent
United States v. Balsara	1910	Asian Indians are White	Scientific evidence, congressional intent
In re Alverto	1912	Persons three-quarters Filipino and one-quarter White are not White	Legal precedent, congressional intent
In re Young	1912	Persons half-German and half-Japanese are not White	Common knowledge, legal precedent
Ex parte Shahid	1913	Syrians are not White	Common knowledge
In re Akhay Kumar Mozumdar	1913	Asian Indians are White	Legal precedent
Ex parte Dow	1914	Syrians are not White	Common knowledge
In re Dow	1914	Syrians are not White	Common knowledge, congressional intent
Dow v. United States	1915	Syrians are White	Scientific evidence, congressional intent, legal precedent
In re Lampitoe	1916	Persons three-quarters Filipino and one-quarter White are not White	Legal precedent
In re Mallari	1916	Filipinos are not White	No explanation
In re Rallos	1917	Filipinos are not White	Legal precedent
In re Sadar Bhagwab Singh	1917	Asian Indians are not White	Common knowledge, congressional intent
In re Mohan Singh	1919	Asian Indians are White	Scientific evidence, legal precedent
In re Bhagat Singh Thind	1920	Asian Indians are White	Legal precedent
Petition of Easurk Emsen Charr	1921	Koreans are not White	Common knowledge, legal precedent
Ozawa v. United States	1922	Japanese are not White	Legal precedent, congressional intent, common knowledge, scientific evidence
United States v. Bhagat Singh Thind	1923	Asian Indians are not White	Common knowledge, congressional intent
Sato v. Hall	1923	Japanese are not White	Legal precedent
United States v. Akhay Kumar Mozumdar	1923	Asian Indians are not White	Legal precedent
United States v. Cartozian	1925	Armenians are White	Scientific evidence, common knowledge, legal precedent
United States v. Ali	1925	Punjabis (whether Hindu or Arabian) are not White	Common knowledge
In re Fisher	1927	Persons three-quarters Chinese and one-quarter White are not White	Legal precedent
United States v. Javier	1927	Filipinos are not White	Legal precedent
In re Feroz Din	1928	Afghanis are not White	Common knowledge
United States v. Gokhale	1928	Asian Indians are not White	Legal precedent
De La Ysla v. United States	1935	Filipinos are not White	Legal precedent
In re Cruz	1938	Persons three-quarters Native American and one-quarter African are not African	Legal precedent
Wadia v. United States	1939	Asian Indians are not White	Common knowledge
De Cano v. State	1941	Filipinos are not White	Legal precedent
Kharaiti Ram Samras v. United States	1942	Asian Indians are not White	Common knowledge, legal precedent
In re Ahmed Hassan	1942	Arabians are not White	Common knowledge, legal precedent
Ex parte Mohriez	1944	Arabians are White	Common knowledge, legal precedent

== Particular groups ==
The boundaries of whiteness have differed across groups, historical periods, and institutional settings. The following sections examine how particular populations have been classified in naturalization proceedings, census records, segregation laws, and social practice. These classifications did not always coincide: recognition as white for one legal purpose did not necessarily establish the same status in another context or ensure equal treatment in everyday life.

=== African Americans ===
Historically, racial classification in the United States included hypodescent, often expressed as the “one-drop rule,” under which any known African ancestry classified a person as Black regardless of appearance. Neil Gotanda argues that this asymmetrical rule reinforced racial subordination by treating whiteness as racial “purity” and Black ancestry as a form of “contamination.”

In 17th-century colonial Virginia and Maryland, lawmakers codified racial boundaries by declaring that children born to Black mothers, even if fathered by white men, would inherit the status of the mother—ensuring perpetual enslaved status and denying them legal whiteness. Some 19th-century categorization schemes defined people with one black parent (the other white) as mulatto, with one black grandparent as quadroon and with one black great grandparent as octoroon. The latter categories remained within an overall black or African American category.

Many members of these categories passed temporarily or permanently as white. Since several thousand blacks have been crossing the color line each year, the phenomenon known as "passing for white", millions of White Americans have recent African ancestors. A statistical analysis done in 1958 estimated that 21% of the white population had African ancestors. The study concluded that the majority of Americans of African descent were actually white and not black.

=== East Asian Americans ===
Beginning in the mid-19th century, the United States experienced significant immigration from East Asia and the Indian subcontinent. Later, as a reaction against Chinese and other East Asian immigrants as competitors of white labor, the Workingmen's Party was created in California. Xenophobic fears manifested with the Yellow Peril ideology, positing that Asians could outnumber the white population in some areas and become dominant.

The Naturalization Act of 1790 restricted naturalized American citizenship to whites. However, United States v. Wong Kim Ark in 1898 confirmed citizenship by birth in the United States regardless of race. As a result, in the early 20th century, many new arrivals with origins in the Far East petitioned the courts to be legally classified as white, resulting in the existence of many U.S. Supreme Court rulings on their "whiteness". In 1921, a petition for naturalization by Easurk Emsen Charr was denied as the court ruled that Koreans are not white. In 1922, the court case Ozawa v. United States deemed that Japanese are part of the Mongoloid race, and thus non-white.

In Jim Crow Mississippi, however, Chinese American children were allowed to attend white-only schools and universities, rather than attend black-only schools, and some of their parents became members of the infamous Mississippi "White Citizens' Council" who enforced policies of racial segregation. Others were excluded from white-only schools and had to attend separate Chinese-only schools, be home schooled or be sent to China for education.

Despite an opposite trend in other parts of the United States, in 1927, the Supreme Court decision Lum v. Rice codified the right of states to define a Chinese student as non-white for the purpose of segregating public schools. As the Jim Crow era lasted between 1876 and 1965, this effectively placed Lum v. Rice within that same time period.

In a precursor to Brown v. Board, the 1947 federal legal case Mendez v. Westminster fought to take down segregated schools for Mexican-American and white students. In doing so, this prompted California Governor Earl Warren to repeal a state law calling for segregation of Native American and Asian-American students in that state. Segregation of the American education system during the Jim Crow era also impacted East Asians; however, the Mendez decision ended this impact on Asian Americans.

Journalist Iris Kuo notes that in Students for Fair Admissions v. Harvard and two employee lawsuits against Google, the anti-affirmative action faction white people aligned with like-minded Asian Americans because they were part of an overrepresented minority. She points to scholarly controversy over whether Asian Americans are "whitening", either through acceptance as having the same social status as white people, considering trends of aligning interests, increasing acceptance, cultural assimilation, high group socioeconomic status, and the idea of a model minority.

=== European Americans ===
The U.S. census considers people having ancestry from any of the original peoples of Europe to be white. Since the 17th century, European Americans have been the largest panethnic group.

==== Czech Americans ====
Academics have debated whether Czech Americans were historically considered white, non-white, or something intermediate. Sociological scholars generally agree that while Eastern and Southern European immigrants, such as Czechs (including Bohemians and Moravians), were socially distinguishable from Northwestern European immigrants such as Norwegians or Swedes, that "no discernible racial boundary existed" that separated Southern and Eastern Europeans from other white people. While some prejudice and discrimination existed against Czechs, Slavs were never classified as non-whites. All mainstream American academics of the 20th century considered Czechs to be white.

==== Finnish Americans ====
The earliest Finnish immigrants to the US were colonists who were Swedes in the legal sense and perhaps spoke Swedish. They settled in the Swedish colony of New Sweden. One of the Founding Fathers of the United States, John Morton, who signed the Declaration of Independence, was Finnish. Franklin D. Roosevelt, the 32nd President of the United States, descended from one of the 17th-century Finnish colonists in New Sweden. More recent Finns were on several occasions "racially" discriminated against and not seen as white, but "Asian". The reasons for this were the arguments and theories about the Finns originally being of Mongolian instead of native European origin due to the Finnish language belonging to the Uralic and not the Indo-European language family.

Minnesota, home to a strong mining industry at the turn of the 20th century, was the stage of several politically-motivated conflicts between laborers and anti-union leaders. In 1907, a group of between 10,000 and 16,000 immigrants – the majority of whom were Finnish – staged a large strike against Oliver Iron Mining Company. In response, the company began screening its immigrant-based workforce by their country of origin. Finns regularly comprised the most numerous and vocal groups of protestors, feeding into beliefs that the Finnish ethnic group was less capable of assimilating well into the American workforce. Oliver refused to hire more Finns.

One year after the major strike, the company's superintendent stated: "Their people [the Finns] are good laborers but trouble breeders.... [T]hey are a race that tries to take advantage of the companies at every opportunity and are not to be trusted."

Acrimony toward Finnish social radicals in Minnesota's political milieu reached a head in the case of John Svan and 15 associates. On January 4, 1908, a trial was held regarding whether John Svan, a socialist, and several other Finnish immigrants would become naturalized United States citizens or not, as the process only was for "whites" and "blacks" in general and district prosecutor John Sweet maintained that Finnish immigrants were Mongols. Sweet linked the "socialistic ideology" of Finnish radicals with other collectivist East Asian philosophies to underscore his position that Finns were of an Asiatic frame of mind that was out of harmony with American thought. The judge, William Alexander Cant, later concluded that the Finnish people may have been Mongolian from the beginning, but that the climate they lived in for a long time, and historical Finnish immigration and assimilation of Germanic tribes (Teutons)—which he considered modern "pure Finns" indistinguishable from—had made the Finnish population one of the whitest people in Europe. If the Finns had Mongol ancestry, it was distant and diluted. John Svan and the others were made naturalized US citizens, and from that day on, the law forbade treating Finnish immigrants and Americans of Finnish descent as not white.

In the beginning of the 20th century, there was a lot resentment from the local American population toward the Finnish settlers because they were seen as having very different customs, and were slow in learning English. Another reason was that many of them had come from the "red side of Finland", and thus held socialist political views.

==== German Americans ====
Large numbers of Germans migrated to North America between the 1680s and 1760s. Many settled in the Province of Pennsylvania. In the 18th century, numerous English Americans in Pennsylvania harbored resentment toward the increasing number of German settlers. Benjamin Franklin, in Observations Concerning the Increase of Mankind, Peopling of Countries, etc., complained about the increasing influx of German Americans, stating that they had a negative influence on American society. According to Franklin, the only exception to this were Germans of Saxon descent, "who with the English, make the principal Body of White People on the Face of the Earth. I could wish their Numbers were increased".

Unlike most European immigrant groups, whose acceptance as white came gradually over the course of the late 19th century (that is, in U.S. colloquial definitions, since virtually all Europeans were white by legal U.S. definition except the Finns), Germans were quickly accepted as white.

==== Irish Americans ====
Beginning in the 1840s, negative assessments of the "Irish character" became more and more racialized. Irish people were considered brutish and (like black people) were often compared to simians. The "Celtic physiognomy" was described as being marked by an "upturned nose [and] the black tint of the skin".

Labor historian Eric Arnesen wrote in 2001 that "the notion that the non-white Irish became white has become axiomatic among many academics"; however, he argued that this was historically inaccurate, and that the Irish in the United States were considered white throughout the 19th and 20th centuries. Whiteness scholar David Roediger has argued that during the early period of Irish immigration to the United States "it was by no means clear that the Irish were white" or "that they would be admitted to all the rights of whites and granted all the privileges of citizenship". However, Arnesen suggests that the Irish were in fact granted full rights and privileges upon naturalization and that early Irish immigrants "often blended unproblematically into American society". Law professor David Bernstein has questioned the idea that Irish Americans were once non-white, writing that Irish Americans were "indeed considered white by law and by custom" despite the fact that they experienced "discrimination, hostility, assertions of inferiority and occasionally even violence". Bernstein notes that Irish Americans were not targeted by laws against interracial marriage, were allowed to attend whites-only schools, were classified as white in the Jim Crow South, and were never subjected to anti-Irish immigration restrictions. The sociologists Philip Q. Yang and Kavitha Koshy have also questioned what they call the "becoming white thesis", noting that Irish Americans have been legally classified as white since the first U.S. census in 1790, that Irish Americans were legally white for the purposes of the Naturalization Act of 1790 that limited citizenship to "free White person(s)", and that they could find no legislative or judicial evidence that Irish Americans had ever been considered non-white.

==== Italian Americans ====
In certain parts of the South during the Jim Crow era, Italians "occupied a racial middle ground within the otherwise unforgiving, binary caste system of white-over-black". Though Italians were viewed as white for purposes of naturalization and voting, their social standing was that they represented a "problem at best". Their racial status was impacted by their appearance and that they did not "act" white, engaging in manual labor ordinarily reserved for blacks. Italians continued to occupy a "middle ground in the racial order" through the 1920s.

However, "color challenges were never sustained or systematic" when it came to Italians, who were "largely accepted as white by the widest variety of people and institutions" throughout the United States. Even in the South, such as Louisiana, any attempts to disenfranchise them "failed miserably".

Although always predominantly and formally considered white within the United States, throughout the majority of American history Italians' whiteness was often brought under scrutiny. Emigration from Italy to the United States began before Italian unification and reached its peak at a time when regional differences were still very strong and marked. Therefore, many Italian immigrants identified (and still identify) primarily on a regional rather than a national basis.

After large numbers of Italians entered into the United States, legal restrictions were put in place to limit further immigration. The Emergency Quota Act, and the subsequent Immigration Act of 1924, though not singling out any specific country or ethnicity, sharply reduced immigration from Italy except for relatives already in the United States. Italians often faced extreme xenophobia in the 1800s and early 1900s. This led to one of the most notable hate crimes against Italian Americans, which was the trial of nineteen Italian immigrants for the murder of New Orleans police chief David Hennessy in 1890. The trial ended in the lynching of eleven of them.

=== Hispanic and Latino Americans ===
Hispanic Americans are Americans who have a significant number of Spanish-speaking Latin American ancestors or Spanish ancestors. While Latin Americans have a broad array of ethnic, racial, and cultural backgrounds, they all tend to be indiscriminately labeled "Hispanic", giving that term a "racial" value.

It was not until the 1980s after years of protest from Chicanos that the United States government created the term Hispanic to classify all peoples who come from Spanish-speaking countries. The term Hispanic has in recent years in the United States been given racial value with the perception of a racial Hispanic look being that of Native American race or of the mixed races, usually mestizo or mulatto, as the majority of the people who immigrate from Spanish-speaking countries to the United States are of that racial origin. Due to this racial perception of Hispanics even among Hispanic Americans themselves, white Hispanics and Latinos, black Hispanics and Latinos, and Asian Hispanics and Latinos are often overlooked in the US mass media and in general American social perceptions. The white Hispanics and Latinos who are perceived as "Hispanic" by Americans usually possess typical Mediterranean or Southern European pigmentation (olive skin, dark hair, and dark eyes) as most Spanish and white Latin American immigrants are and most white Hispanics and Latinos are.

On the 2000 U.S. census form, race and ethnicity are distinct questions. A respondent who checks the "Hispanic or Latino" ethnicity box must also check one or more of the five official race categories. Of the over 35 million Hispanics or Latinos in the 2000 census, a plurality of 48.6% identified as "white," 48.2% identified as "Other" (most of whom are presumed of mixed races such as mestizo or mulatto), and the remaining 3.2% identified as "black" and other races.

By 2010, the number of Hispanics identifying as white has increased by a wide margin since the year 2000 on the 2010 US census form, of the over 50 million people who identified as Hispanic and Latino Americans a majority 53% identified as "white", 36.7% identified as "Other" (most of whom are presumed of mixed races such as mestizo or mulatto), 6% identified as "Two or more races", 2.5% identified as "black", 1.4% identified as "American Indian and Alaska Native", and the remaining 0.5% identified as other races.

The media and some Hispanic community leaders in the United States refer to Hispanics as a separate group from all others, as well as "whites" and the "white majority". This may be because "white" is often used as shorthand for "non-Hispanic white". Thus, the non-Hispanic population and some Hispanic community leaders refer to white Hispanics as non-Hispanic whites and white Hispanic actors/actresses in media are mostly given non-Hispanic roles while, in turn, are given the most roles in the US Hispanic mass media that the white Hispanics are overrepresented and admired in the US Hispanic mass media and social perceptions. (Edit needed: the preceding sentence is grammatically incorrect and illogical). Multiracial Latinos have limited media appearance; critics have accused the U.S. Hispanic media of overlooking the brown-skinned Indigenous and multiracial Hispanic and black Hispanic populations by over-representation of blond and blue/green-eyed white Hispanic and Latino Americans and also light-skinned mestizo (and sometimes mulatto) Hispanic and Latino Americans (often deemed as white persons in U.S. Hispanic and Latino populations if achieving the middle-class or higher social status), especially some of the actors on the telenovelas.

==== Mexican Americans ====
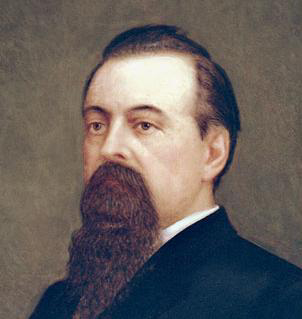
Official portrait of Mexican American Romualdo Pacheco in the California State Capitol.

The official racial status of Mexican Americans has varied throughout American history. From 1850 to 1920, the U.S. census form did not distinguish between whites and Mexican Americans. In 1930, the U.S. census form asked for "color or race", and census enumerators were instructed to write W for white and Mex for Mexican. In 1940 and 1950, the census reverted its decision and made Mexicans be classified as white again and thus the instructions were to "Report "white" (W) for Mexicans unless they are definitely of Indian or other nonwhite race".

During periods in U.S. history when racial intermarriage was not legally acknowledged, and when Mexicans and Mexican Americans were uniformly allotted white status, they were legally allowed to intermarry with what today are termed non-Hispanic whites, unlike blacks and Asians. They were allowed to acquire U.S. citizenship upon arrival; served in all-white units during World War II; could vote and hold elected office in places such as Texas, especially San Antonio; ran the state politics and constituted most of the elite of New Mexico since colonial times; and went to segregated white schools in Central Texas and Los Angeles. Additionally, Asians were barred from marrying Mexican Americans because Mexicans were legally white.

U.S. nativists in the late 1920s and 1930s (mostly due to the socially xenophobic and economic climate of the Great Depression) tried to put a halt to Mexican immigration by having Mexicans (and Mexican Americans) declared non-white, by virtue of their Indian heritage. After 70 years of being in the United States and having been bestowed white status by the US government, this was the first time the United States began to show true racist attitudes toward Mexicans in the United States, something that usually came quickly to people of other races. They based their strategy on a 1924 law that barred entry to immigrants who were ineligible for citizenship, and at that point, only blacks and whites, and not Asians or Native Americans, could naturalize and become U.S. citizens. The test case came in December 1935, when a Buffalo, New York judge rejected Jalisco native Timoteo Andrade's application for citizenship on the grounds that he was a "Mexican Indian". Had it not been for the intervention of the Mexican and American governments, who forced a second hearing, this precedent could very well have made many Mexicans, the majority of whom are mestizo, ineligible for citizenship. When mixed-race Mexicans were allowed to retain their white status in American society they were unperturbed with the fact that the United States still continued its discriminatory practices toward Mexicans of full Indigenous heritage.

During the Great Depression, Mexicans were largely considered non-white. As many as 400,000 Mexicans and Mexican Americans were deported in a decade-long effort by the government called the Mexican Repatriation.

In the 2000 U.S. census, around half of all persons of Mexican or Mexican American origin in the United States checked white to register their race (in addition to stating their Mexican national origin). Mexican Americans are the largest white Hispanic group in the United States.

Historian Marc Simon Rodriguez argues that Mexican Americans’ ability to invoke legal whiteness did not necessarily secure the protections or social advantages associated with being white.

==== West Indian Americans ====
Caribbean countries such as Cuba, the U.S. territory of Puerto Rico, and especially the Dominican Republic have a complex ethnic heritage since they include Indigenous and African legacies. Africans were forcibly transported to the islands throughout the colonial period (and indeed blacks accompanied the first Spanish explorers, with more arriving to harvest sugar in the 18th century prior to the American Revolution).

Cuban Americans and Puerto Ricans exemplify this complex ethnic status. The Cuban exiles and the Puerto Ricans who migrated, entered the United States before 1959 tended to be of European ancestry (most particularly Spanish ancestry) and therefore were/are white. Their appearance let them be more accepted by an American culture that openly attacked Afro-Cubans and Afro-Puerto Ricans, and other races. In some cases, this white racial status "allowed them to feel superior over other racial and ethnic groups and to make claims to rights and privileges".

=== Jewish Americans ===
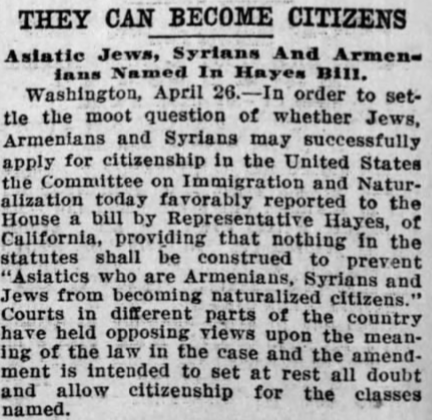
"They Can Become Citizens", a 1910 article in The Baltimore Sun regarding citizenship for "Asiatic Jews", Syrians, and Armenians.

Due to centuries of living in a diaspora, Jews descend from various geographical regions, mostly the MENA region (Middle East and North Africa) and Europe, as well as Asia and Africa. In the 19th and early 20th centuries, European Jews in the United States were legally classified as white, but were frequently described as "Mongoloid" or "Asiatic" by advocates of scientific racism. During the 19th century, the United States Bureau of Immigration had classified Jews as "Slavonic...a subgroup of the elite Aryan stock", but the Dillingham Commission contended that linguistic, physical, and other criteria classified Jews as Semites, thus "lower down on the Caucasian ladder". A 1909 Census Bureau ruling related to the case of George Shishim to classify Syrians as "Mongolians", thus non-white and ineligible for citizenship, caused American Jewish leaders to fear that Jews would be denied naturalization like other "Asiatic" groups.

In 1914, during a hearing of the Dow v. United States court case, Judge Henry Smith stated that the term "Jew" was a religious and not a racial distinction. He further stated that European Jews were not separate from other Europeans in any "racial sense" and that European Jews should be considered "racially, physiologically, and psychologically" European. Defending the exclusion of Syrian Jews as non-white, Judge Smith stated that the admission of white European Jews had nothing to do with the exclusion of dark-skinned "African or Asiastic" Jews.

Law professor David Bernstein has questioned the idea that American Jews were once considered collectively non-white, writing that American Jews were "indeed considered white by law and by custom" despite the fact that they experienced "discrimination, hostility, assertions of inferiority and occasionally even violence." Bernstein notes that Jews were not targeted by laws against interracial marriage, were allowed to attend whites-only schools, and were classified as white in the Jim Crow South. The sociologists Philip Q. Yang and Kavitha Koshy have also questioned what they call the "becoming white thesis", noting that most European Jews have been legally classified as white since the first US census in 1790, were legally white for the purposes of the Naturalization Act of 1790 that limited citizenship to "free White person(s)", and that they could find no legislative or judicial evidence that American Jews had ever been considered collectively non-white.

The racial status of Jews has continued to engender social debate, with some commentators arguing that Jews are collectively non-white. As the US census defines white people as people "having origins in any of the original peoples of Europe, the Middle East or North Africa", Jewish Americans of European, North African, and Middle Eastern heritage are classified as white. African American Jews, Asian American Jews, Native American Jews, some Hispanic and Latino Jews, and other non-white Jews are often known as Jews of color.

=== Middle Eastern Americans ===
The US Census Bureau includes the "original peoples of Europe, North Africa, or the Middle East" among white people. Under pressure from advocacy groups, the Census Bureau announced in 2014 that it would consider establishing a new, MENA ethnic category for populations from the Middle East, North Africa, and the Arab world, separate from the "white" category. On March 9, 2024, the US Federal Register announced a new Middle Eastern or North African (MENA) option in federal forms, including the census on race and ethnicity questions.

The courts ruled West Asians as not white in the following cases: In re Halladjian (1909), Ex parte Shahid (1913), Ex Parte Dow (1914), In re Dow (1914), and In re Ahmed Hassan (1942). The courts ruled Arabs, Syrians, West Asians, or Armenians to be white in the following cases: In re Najour (1909), In re Mudarri (1910), In re Ellis (1910), Dow v. United States (1915), United States v. Cartozian (1925), and Ex Parte Mohriez (1944).

==== Arab Americans ====
From 1909 to 1944, members of Arab American communities in the United States sought naturalized citizenship through an official recognition as white. During this period, the courts were inconsistent in defining Arabs as white granting some eligibility for citizenship, while denying others. Therefore, in the first half of the 20th century, many Arabs were naturalized as "white American" citizens, while others were deported as "non-white aliens".

One of the earliest cases includes the case of police officer George Shishim. Born in Zahlé, Lebanon, Shishim immigrated to the United States in 1894 becoming a police officer in Venice, Los Angeles. According to Sarah Gualtieri, Shishim's "legal battle to prove his whiteness began after he arrested the son of a prominent lawyer for disturbing the peace." The man arrested argued that because Shishim was not white, and thus ineligible for citizenship, that his arrest was invalid. Shishim's attorneys, with support from the Syrian-Lebanese and Arab communities, argued Arabs shared Caucasian ancestry and are thus white. Judge Frank Hutton, who presided over the case, cited legal precedent ruling that the term "white person" included Syrians. Despite this ruling, neither US immigration authorities nor courts across the country consistently defined Arabs as whites, and many Arabs continued to be deported through the 1940s.

Among the most important cases was Dow v. United States (1915) in which Syrian George Dow was determined to be of the "Caucasian" race and thus eligible for citizenship. In 1914, Judge Smith denied George Dow citizenship twice ruling that Syrians were not white and thus ineligible for citizenship. Dow appealed these decisions and in Dow v. United States, the United States Court of Appeals overturned the lower court's decisions, defined Syrians as white, and affirmed Dow's right to naturalization. However, this decision did not apply to North Africans or non-Levantine Arabs, and some courts claimed that only Syrians (and not other Arab persons) were white. The situation was resolved in 1943, when all Arabs and North Africans were deemed white by the federal government. Ex Parte Mohriez (1944) and the 1977 OMB Directive 15 include Middle Eastern and North African in the definition of white.

==== Armenian Americans ====
Another 1909 immigration and naturalization case found that Armenians were white and thus eligible for citizenship. A US circuit court judge in Boston, ruling on a citizenship application by four Armenians, overruled government objections and found that West Asians were so mixed with Europeans that it was impossible to tell whether they were white or should be excluded as part of the "yellow race". In making the ruling, the judge also noted that the government had already made no objection to Jews. The judge ruled that "if aboriginal people of Asia are excluded it is hard to find a loophole for the admission of Hebrews."

==== Muslim Americans ====
According to a survey conducted by ISPU, most Muslims that voted for Trump identified as White (which until recently was what Arabs fell under in the United States census) and exhibited anti-Muslim sentiment as readily as non-Muslim Trump supporters.

=== Native Americans ===
In the late 19th and 20th centuries, some European Americans promoted the idea that Native Americans were peoples without a future, who should be assimilated into mainstream American culture. Tribal citizenship was frequently defined according to blood quantum standards (proven through a Certificate of Degree of Indian Blood), so that non-citizens of mostly white ancestry and more distant Native ancestry were denied any legal status within the tribe of their ancestors. This led to the classification of increasing numbers of people of distant Indigenous ancestry as white. In recent years, more Americans increasingly self-identify among mixed-race people as being Native American; however, this has no legal standing. In Oklahoma, state laws identified Native Americans as legally white during the Jim Crow era. The 2000 US census includes "tribal affiliation or community attachment" as part of the definitions of American Indian and Alaska Native.

=== Pacific Islander Americans ===
In the 1889 case of In re Kanaka Nian, the court ruled that Hawaiians are not white based on scientific evidence.

=== South Asian Americans ===
South Asian Americans constitute a broad group of ethnic groups and racial classification of each of these groups has varied over the years. The classification of Indian Americans has varied over the years and across institutions. Originally, neither the US courts nor the US Census Bureau categorized Indians as a race because there were only negligible numbers of Indian immigrants in the US. Various court judgements instead deemed Indians to be "white" or "not white" for the purposes of law.

Unlike Indian Americans, Nepalese Americans and Sri Lankan Americans have always been classified as "Asian". Before 1975, both groups were classified as "other Asian". In 1975, they were given their own separate categories within the broader Asian American category.

In 1909, Bhicaji Balsara became the first Indian to gain US citizenship, as a Zoroastrian Parsi he was ruled to be "the purest of Aryan type" and "as distinct from Hindus as are the English who dwell in India". Almost thirty years later, the same circuit court to accept Balsara ruled that Rustom Dadabhoy Wadia, another Parsi also from Bombay was not white and therefore not eligible to receive US citizenship.

In 1923, the US Supreme Court decided in United States v. Bhagat Singh Thind that people of Indian descent were not "white" men, and thus not eligible for citizenship. The court conceded that, while Thind was a high caste Hindu born in the northern Punjab region and classified by certain scientific authorities as of the Aryan race, he was not "white" since the word Aryan "has to do with linguistic and not at all with physical characteristics" and since "the average man knows perfectly well that there are unmistakable and profound differences" between Indians and White Americans. Associate Justice George Sutherland wrote that Indians "cannot be properly assigned to any of the enumerated grand racial divisions". Following the Thind ruling, the US government attempted to strip Indian Americans of their citizenship, but were forced to drop many of the cases after losing their case against Thind's own lawyer, Sakharam Ganesh Pandit, who successfully argued that he would be unjustly harmed by removal of his American citizenship.

The US Census Bureau has over the years changed its own classification of Indians. In 1930 and 1940, Indian Americans were classified as "Hindu" by "Race", and in 1950 and 1960, they were categorized as Other Race, and in 1970, they were deemed white. Since 1980, Indians and other South Asians have been classified according to self-reporting, with many selecting "Asian Indian" to differentiate themselves from peoples of "American Indian" or Native American background.

=== Southeast Asian Americans ===
In the 1894 case of In re Po, the court ruled that Burmese are not white based on common knowledge and legal precedent. Moreover, courts ruled Filipinos as not white in the following cases: In re Lampitoe (1916), In re Mallari (1916), In re Rallos (1917), United States v. Javier (1927), De La Ysla v. United States (1935), and De Cano v. State (1941).

== See also ==
- Becoming white thesis
- Historical racial and ethnic demographics of the United States
- Race and ethnicity in the United States
- Race and ethnicity in the United States census
- The History of White People
- Miscegenation
- Passing
- Person of color
- Racism in the United States
