= In re Saito =

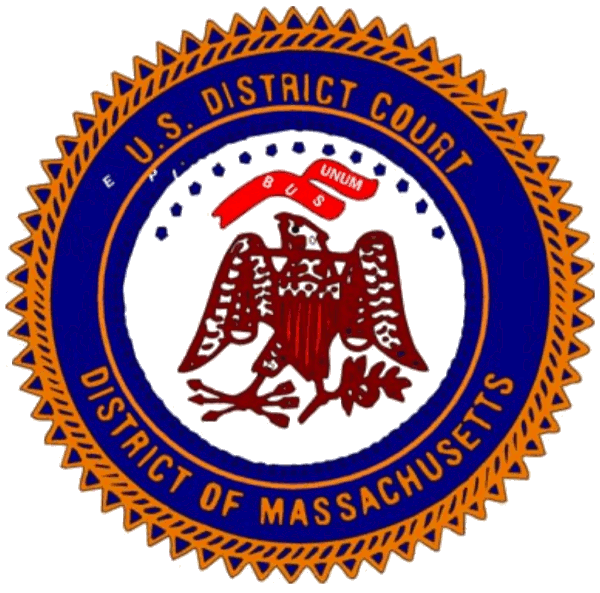
- Court: District Court of Massachusetts
- Full case name: In re Saito
- Decided: June 27, 1894
- Cases cited: In re Ah Yup

Ruling
- Saito, a native of Japan, was not entitled to naturalization as he was not included within the term, "white person."

Court membership
- Chief judge: Judge LeBaron B. Colt

Case opinions
- Common knowledge, scientific evidence, congressional intent, and legal precedent.

Laws applied
- Naturalization Act of 1870

In re Saito was a naturalization case that took place in Massachusetts in 1894. Shebalto Saito, a Japanese immigrant, filed paperwork to become a citizen of the United States. On June 27, 1894, Judge LeBaron B. Colt of the Circuit Court of the District of Massachusetts in Boston, ruled on Mr. Saito's petition. The key question in this case was whether Mr. Saito was eligible for citizenship as a Japanese immigrant. The Naturalization Act of 1870 had been expanded to include those of African descent, to reflect the 14th Amendment, which redefined who could be citizens of the United States. In this era soon after the 14th Amendment was passed, many immigrants to the United States applied for citizenship to challenge previous restrictions that had only allowed Caucasian people to naturalize. Judge Colt concluded that the Japanese belonged to the “Mongolian” race, and denied Mr. Saito's petition. The case became a prerequisite case for future cases determining the race and citizenship eligibility of Japanese people in the United States.

== History ==
=== Shebalto Saito's Immigration ===
Shebalto Saito was 29 years old when he applied for naturalization in 1894. He had emigrated from Japan about 15 years earlier in 1879 and had lived in Boston for most of that time. Saito was married and had several children. Most Japanese immigrants settled in the United States in agricultural jobs, building railroads, working in saw mills and factories, usually in the Western states, especially Hawaii. The wages in the United States were much higher than in Japan, and the lure of better wages brought many Japanese men to work there. The hope was to save up enough money to establish themselves in the United States or to return home with enough money to become a farmer or a merchant.

Though the largest numbers of Japanese immigrants were located in the West Coast, there were small Japanese immigrant communities in New England, where In re Saito took place. Connecticut and Massachusetts had the largest Japanese communities in the region. The first Japanese immigrant arrived in Boston around 1890. Many Japanese immigrants worked in naval jobs or in supporting industries - like restaurants and housing. Universities in Boston also attracted some Japanese students to the region.

The court case, In re Saito, covers his application for citizenship which was denied in 1894. An immigrant had to be living in the United States for five years and must have resided in the state they were filing in for at least one year to meet the application requirements. In the late nineteenth century, the citizenship process took at least five years. First, an immigrant had to file a Declaration of Intent. Two years later, they could petition for naturalization.

=== Racial Hierarchies ===
By the late nineteenth century in the United States of America, racial hierarchies had developed as different ethnic groups interacted with each other. For example, the terms “Caucasian,” “Negro,” and “Indian,” were used to describe what was thought of as the three races of America (white, black, and red). In general, white Americans believed they were the superior race and should rule over other races, claiming that other races were incapable of good democracy.

As white Americans began to have more encounters with Asian countries through trade and immigration, new racial categories developed. People from Asia were often referred to as “Mongolian” or “yellow” and classified as inferior to white people but superior to Black people. However, racial categorization was not set-in-stone. Rather, the perceptions of different races were created and contested through various legal and social processes. During this time, the racial treatment of Japanese immigrants in the United States was a gray area. Some considered Japanese to be the same as, or similar to, the Caucasian race. Others grouped them with the Chinese, or “yellow” race. Eventually, Japanese immigrants applied for citizenship and their racial status was contested in courts. The cases that determined racial categories were significant factors in the formation of racial hierarchies in the United States. Those courts usually denied citizenship based on perceptions of race, solidifying Japanese immigrants' status as non-white. In re Saito was a pivotal case in the racialization of Japanese immigrants.

In the nineteenth century, Japanese immigrants to the United States were treated as similar to the Chinese, but slightly superior. In the beginning stages of Japanese immigration to America, white Americans thought of them more positively than Chinese immigrants. Japan was viewed as a more civilized nation than China, because of its government, culture, and willingness to adopt some Western practices. In the latter nineteenth century as the Chinese state experienced failure and Chinese immigration to the United States increased, Americans’ perceptions of the Chinese grew increasingly negative. Then, as the Japanese gained more international power and political influence, they were racially described as threatening and inferior. Some race historians describe this process as “turning from white to yellow.” More and more, Japanese immigrants were categorized as “Mongolian” and the distinction between Chinese and Japanese began to disappear in the minds of many white Americans.

=== Precedent Cases ===
In re Saito was one of twelve precedent cases that dealt with application for citizenship by non-European persons from 1878 to 1909. The applications came from Chinese, Hawaiian, Burmese, Japanese, Mexican, Asian Indian, and mixed race immigrants. Eleven of the twelve applications were denied. These decisions served as prerequisites for future cases that continually fortified non-white racial classifications. The court decisions determined the definitions of whiteness in the United States.

=== Japanese and United States Relations ===
In 1894, the same year as In re Saito, the United States and Japan created a trade and immigration treaty called the Treaty of 1894. The treaty created "most-favored-nation” status between Japan and the United States, which was meant to insure that they would have equal trade treatment to what other most-favored-nations received. In the treaty, the United States agreed with the stipulation that all Japanese immigrants in the United States would be granted rights equal to U.S. citizenship.

In reality, the United States did not honor these agreements. Many Japanese immigrants in the United States were not allowed the same privileges as citizens. As tensions between white citizens and Japanese immigrant communities increased, Japanese people experienced prejudice and unequal treatment by their white community leaders. In 1906, because of the influence of racist mobs, the San Francisco Board of Education forced the segregation of Japanese children into Asian schools which was a violation of the treaty. This caused a diplomatic rift that led to the Gentleman's Agreement of 1907.

== The Case ==
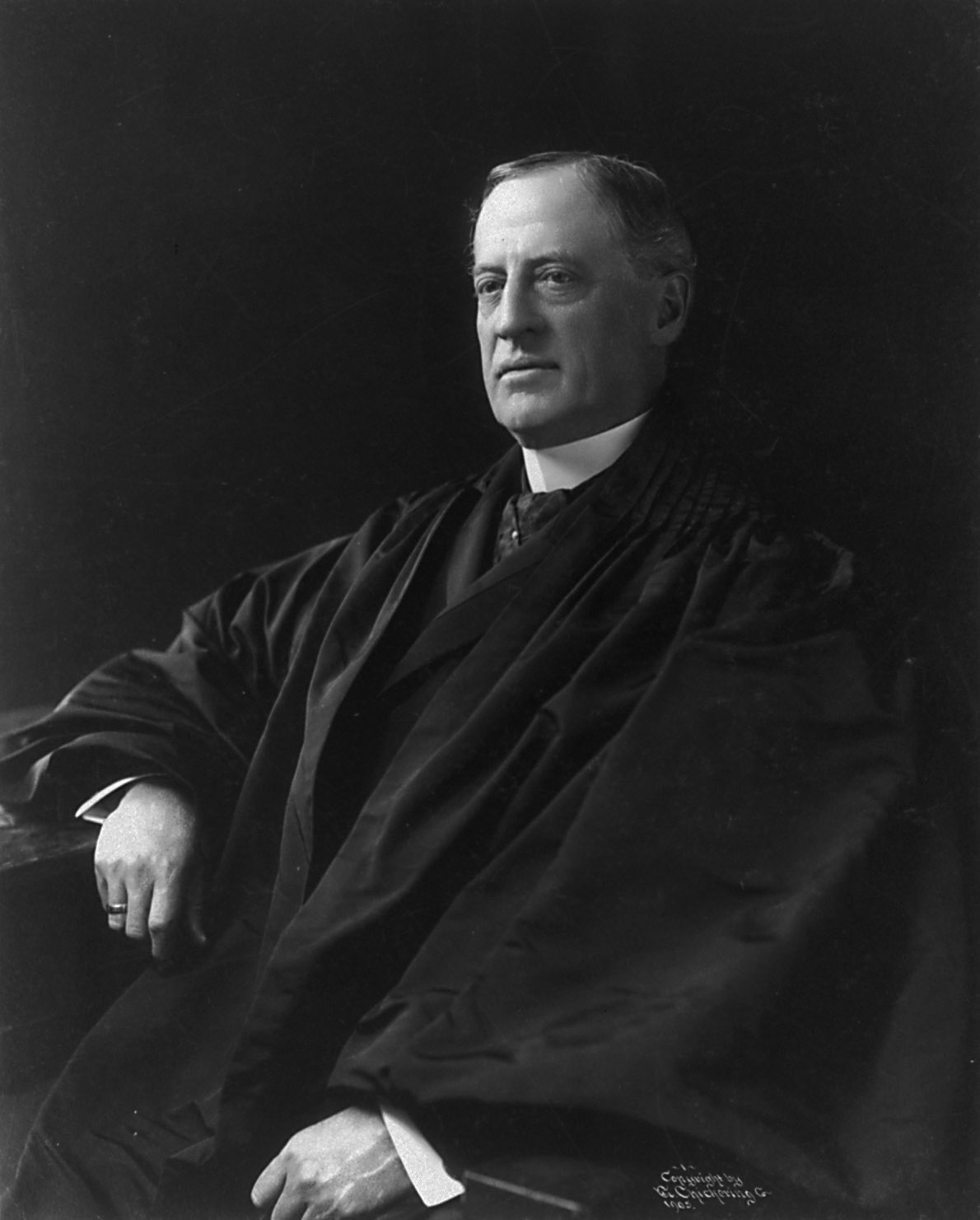
Judge LeBaron B. Colt

In re Saito took place in the Federal District Court of Massachusetts under the jurisdiction of Judge Lebaron B. Colt. Saito had applied for citizenship and was denied because of his race. The critical question of this case was whether Saito, as a Japanese immigrant, was white. If he was white he would qualify for citizenship. If he was not white, his application would be denied. Judge Colt used common knowledge, scientific evidence, congressional intent, and legal precedent, to determine that Saito was non-white and could not become a citizen of the United States.

=== Common knowledge ===
In his justification to deny Saito citizenship, Colt claimed that dividing the races between white, black, yellow, and brown was common knowledge among all people. He explained that anyone knew how to separate people by skin color and that the Japanese were considered yellow and not white.

=== Scientific evidence ===
Judge Colt cited Blumenbach, Cuvier, and Huxley in their various scientific (now considered pseudoscientific) divisions of the races. All of them had a division for the “yellow” race which they called the Mongolian, Mongol, or Mongoloid. They included Japanese people in this category. Colt pointed these scientists out as the authority on racial science, and deferred to their knowledge of the Japanese as Mongolian and not white.

=== Congressional intent ===
Colt analyzed the congressional intent behind the Naturalization Acts of 1802 and 1870 and the revisions of 1872 and 1875. He explained that in 1802 the Naturalization Act indicated that only white persons could become citizens. He stated that the intent here was to specifically exclude black and red races, which were the only prevalent races of that time. In 1870, the Naturalization Act was altered to include the 14th Amendment which allowed citizenship for African and African descended people. In the 1870 legislative session, Senator Charles Sumner had wanted to strike out the word white so that persons of any race could naturalize, but his petition was denied. Colt explained that the inclusion of the words “white persons” in the Naturalization Act were inserted to purposefully exclude Asians. In the 1872 revision, the words “white persons” were not included. Then, in the 1875 revision they were added back in. Colt claimed that reincorporating the designation of white persons was meant to exclude the Chinese and Japanese.

=== Legal precedent ===
Colt's final justification was legal precedent. He cited a previous case, In re Ah Yup (1878), in which Judge Lorenzo Sawyer determined a Chinese immigrant to be forbidden from naturalizing. Colt asserted that at the time of In re Ah Yup Japanese and Chinese immigrants had the same legal status, thus his claim was that Sawyer's decision in that case could also apply to Saito.

== Aftermath ==
=== Status of Japanese Immigrants ===
After the ruling for In re Saito, Japanese immigrants were largely considered non-white. This "inferior" racial classification and ineligibility for citizenship affected their possibilities in the United States. Japanese immigrants and their children had little access to purchasing land, starting businesses, or pursuing educational opportunities. Also, they were virtually powerless in changing their circumstances because of their exclusion from voting rights.

=== Gentlemen's Agreement (1907) ===
This was an agreement negotiated between the United States and Japan in a series of six memos between 1906 and 1907 as a response to anti-Japanese fervor in California. When the San Francisco School Board voted to send Japanese students to segregated Chinese schools, they violated the Treaty of 1894 and created tension between the Japanese and American governments. To resolve this tension, President Theodore Roosevelt and Emperor Meiji negotiated The Gentlemen's Agreement. The Japanese promised to not allow the emigration of laborers, skilled or unskilled, to the United States, and the United States agreed to allow the families (parents, wives and children) of the laborers already in the United States to come from Japan and join them. This created restriction on Japanese immigration that was not altered until 1952. However, unlike the Chinese Exclusion Act that barred any Chinese immigration, because the Gentlemen's Agreement allowed the families of Japanese immigrants to join them, a second-generation of Japanese immigrants in the United States was created, called the Nisei.

=== Ozawa vs. United States (1922) ===
Ozawa vs. United States was the first case on non-white citizenship application that the U.S. Supreme Court agreed to take up since the 1878 ruling for In re Ah Yup, which concluded Chinese people were not white. The ruling was made amidst contradicting social opinions on what race the Japanese fit in to. William Griffis, a white expert on the Japanese, spent his adult life advocating through books and newspaper articles that Japanese immigrants should be able to become U.S. citizens. The Nation and the New York Evening Post newspapers deemed him the "veteran authority upon Japan.” He claimed, using some "scientific methods" and many “scholars, archaeologists and ethnologists,” that Japanese people were white and distinct from the Chinese people, and therefore not part of the Mongolian race. Ozawa vs. United States was first heard in the territorial courts of Hawaii in 1916. Ozawa's application to citizenship was denied and he appealed the ruling. Six years later, in 1922, it was on the docket of the U.S. Supreme Court. They agreed to rule on it. The justices “manipulated” Griffis's claims in such a way to conclude that the Japanese people were not white, but rather "Mongolian" and ineligible for American citizenship.

=== McCarren-Walter Act (1952) ===
The McCarren-Walter Act of 1952 allowed for people of Asian descent to immigrate and become citizens of the United States. However, national origins quotas were set at very low amounts. The number of all Asian people allowed to immigrate into the United States per year was capped at 3,690 persons. Japanese, Chinese, Korean & Filipino American organizations lobbied to have these quotas abolished.
