= George Dow (disambiguation) =

George Dow (1907–1987) was a British railway employee and historian.

George Dow may also refer to:

- George Francis Dow (1868–1936), American antiquarian
- George P. Dow (1840–1910), American civil war Union army sergeant
- George Augustus La Dow (1826–1875), American politician from Oregon
- George Dow, the plaintiff in the United States Supreme Court case Dow v. United States
