= Treaty of Guadalupe Hidalgo =

1848 agreement ending the Mexican–American War (1846-1848)

Treaty of Peace, Friendship, Limits, and Settlement between the United States of America and the United Mexican States
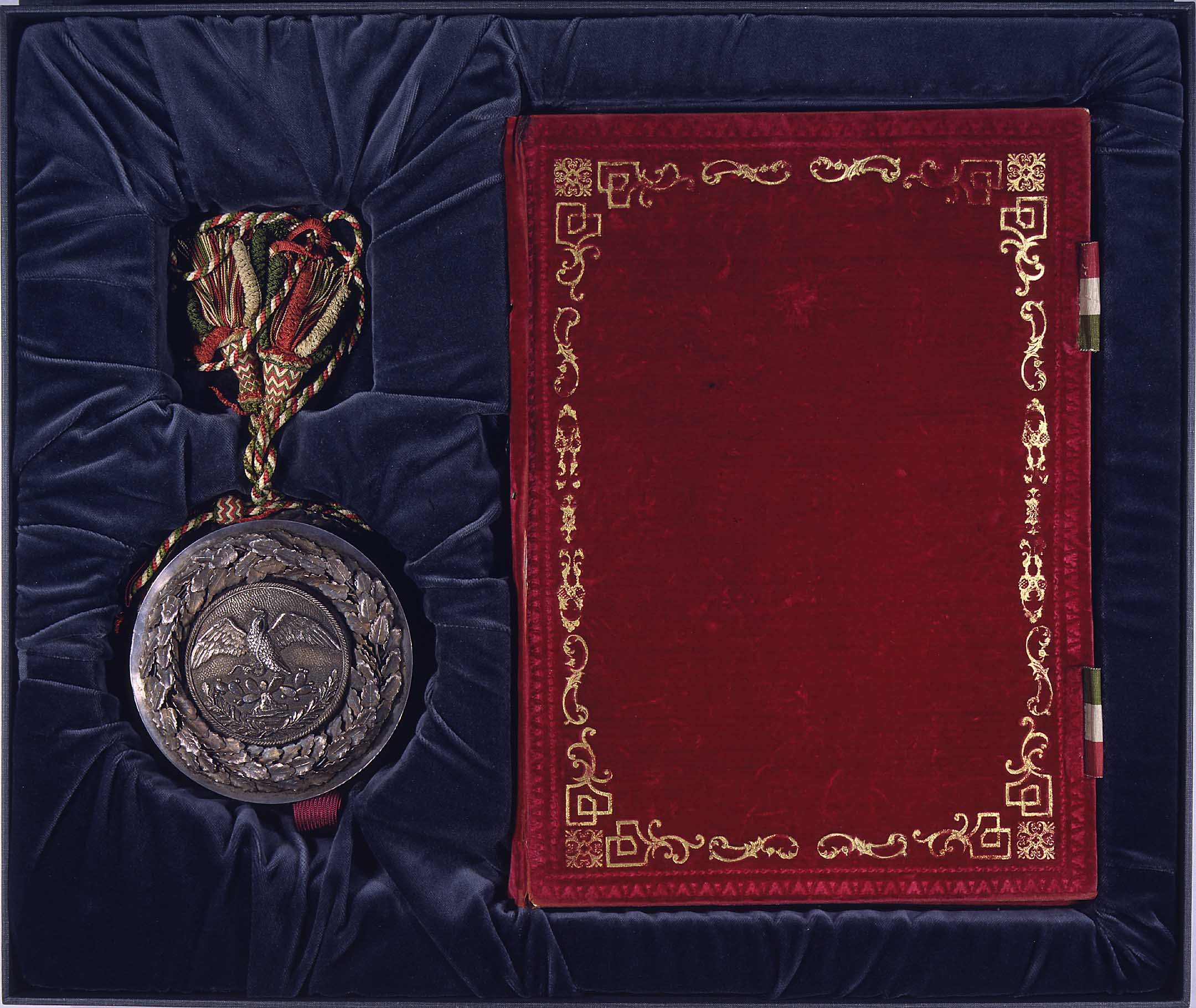
- Cover of the exchange copy of the treaty of Guadalupe Hidalgo
- Signed: 2 February 1848; 178 years ago
- Location: Guadalupe Hidalgo
- Effective: 30 May 1848; 178 years ago
- Negotiators: List: José Bernardo Couto; Miguel de Atristain; Luis Gonzaga Cuevas; Nicholas Trist
- Parties: Mexico; United States
- Citations: 9 Stat. 922; TS 207; 9 Bevans 791
- See also the military convention of 29 February 1848 (5 Miller 407; 9 Bevans 807).

The Treaty of Guadalupe Hidalgo (Note: (Spanish: Tratado de Guadalupe Hidalgo), officially the Treaty of Peace, Friendship, Limits, and Settlement between the United States of America and the United Mexican States.) officially ended the Mexican–American War (1846–1848). It was signed on the 2nd of February 1848 in the town of Guadalupe Hidalgo.

After the defeat of its army and the fall of the capital in September 1847, Mexico entered into peace negotiations with the U.S. envoy, Nicholas Trist. The resulting treaty required Mexico to cede 55 percent of its territory including the present-day states of California, Nevada, Utah, most of Arizona, and parts of New Mexico, Colorado, and Wyoming. Mexico also relinquished all claims for Texas and recognized the Rio Grande as the southern boundary of Texas.

In turn, the U.S. government paid Mexico $15 million "in consideration of the extension acquired by the boundaries of the United States" and agreed to pay debts owed to U.S. citizens by the Mexican government. Mexicans in areas annexed by the U.S. could relocate within Mexico's new boundaries or receive U.S. citizenship and full civil rights.

The United States ratified the treaty on 10 March and Mexico on 19 May. The ratifications were exchanged on 30 May, and the treaty was proclaimed on 4 July 1848.

The U.S. Senate ratified the treaty by a vote of 38–16. The opponents of this treaty were led by the Whigs, who had opposed the war and rejected manifest destiny in general, and rejected this expansion in particular. The amount of land gained by the United States from Mexico was further increased due to the Gadsden Purchase of 1853, which ceded parts of present-day southern Arizona and New Mexico to the United States.

== Negotiators ==
Nicholas Trist negotiated the peace talks; Trist, the chief clerk of the U.S. State Department, accompanied General Winfield Scott as a diplomat and President James K. Polk's representative. After two previous unsuccessful attempts to negotiate a treaty with General José Joaquín de Herrera, Trist and General Scott determined that the only way to deal with Mexico was as a conquered enemy. Trist negotiated with a special commission representing the collapsed government led by José Bernardo Couto, Miguel de Atristain, and Luis Gonzaga Cuevas of Mexico.

== Terms ==
"Mapa de los Estados Unidos de Méjico by John Disturnell, the 1847 map used during the negotiations

Article I of the treaty stated that there "shall be firm and universal peace," which allowed both sides to come to a peace agreement.

Although Mexico ceded Alta California and Santa Fe de Nuevo México, the text of the treaty did not list territories to be ceded and avoided the disputed issues that were causes of war: the validity of the 1836 revolution that established the Republic of Texas, Texas's boundary claims as far as the Rio Grande, and the right of the Republic of Texas to arrange the 1845 annexation of Texas by the United States.

Instead, Article V of the treaty described the new U.S.–Mexico border. From east to west, the border consisted of the Rio Grande northwest from its mouth to the point where it strikes the southern boundary of New Mexico (roughly 32 degrees north), as shown in the Disturnell map, then due west from this point to the 110th meridian west, then north along the 110th meridian to the Gila River and down the river to its mouth. Unlike the New Mexico segment of the boundary, which depended partly on unknown geography, "to preclude all difficulty in tracing upon the ground the limit separating Upper from Lower California", a straight line was drawn from the mouth of the Gila to one marine league south of the southernmost point of the Port of San Diego, slightly north of the previous Mexican provincial boundary at Playas de Rosarito.

Comparing the boundary in the Adams–Onís Treaty to the Guadalupe Hidalgo boundary, Mexico conceded about 55% of its pre-war, pre-Texas territorial claims and now had an area of 1,972,550 km^{2} (761,610 sq mi).

In the United States, the 1.36 million km^{2} (530,000 sq mi) of area between the Adams-Onís and Guadalupe Hidalgo boundaries outside the 1,007,935 km^{2} (389,166 sq mi) claimed by the Republic of Texas is known as the Mexican Cession. That is to say, the Mexican Cession is construed not to include any territory east of the Rio Grande, while the territorial claims of the Republic of Texas included no territory west of the Rio Grande. The Mexican Cession included essentially the entirety of the former Mexican territory of Alta California, but only the western portion of Santa Fe de Nuevo Mexico, and includes all of present-day California, Nevada and Utah, most of Arizona, the western portions of New Mexico and Colorado, and the southwestern corner of Wyoming.

Articles VIII ensured the safety of existing property rights of Mexican citizens living in the transferred territories. Despite assurances to the contrary, land grants by the Mexican government to its citizens were often not honored by the United States because of unilateral modifications to and interpretations of the Treaty and U.S. legal decisions. Land disputes between the descendants of Mexican land owners and Anglo Americans continued into the 21st century. The United States also agreed to assume $3.25 million (equivalent to $120.9 million today) in debts that Mexico owed to United States citizens.

The residents had one year to choose whether they wanted American or Mexican citizenship; over 90% chose American citizenship. The others moved to what remained of Mexico (where they received land) or, in some cases in New Mexico, were allowed to remain in place as Mexican citizens. Article IX allows for protections to those Mexicans that would like to become American citizens. These protections include all those allowed by the U.S. Constitution and including employment protections.

Article X established that all land grants given to Mexican citizens by either Mexico or Spain would be honored by the U.S. government.

Article XII engaged the United States to pay, "In consideration of the extension acquired", 15 million dollars (equivalent to $560 million today), in annual installments of 3 million dollars.

Article XI of the treaty was important to Mexico. It provided that the United States would prevent and punish raids by Indians into Mexico, prohibited Americans from acquiring property, including livestock, taken by the Indians in those raids, and stated that the United States would return captives of the Indians to Mexico. Mexicans believed that the United States had encouraged and assisted the Comanche and Apache raids that had devastated northern Mexico in the years before the war. This article promised relief to them.

Article XI, however, proved unenforceable. Destructive Indian raids continued despite a heavy U.S. presence near the Mexican border. Mexico filed 366 claims with the U.S. government for damages done by Comanche and Apache raids between 1848 and 1853. In 1853, in the Treaty of Mesilla concluding the Gadsden Purchase, Article XI was annulled.

=== Results ===
The land that the Treaty of Guadalupe Hidalgo brought into the United States became, between 1850 and 1912, all or part of nine states: California (1850), Nevada (1864), Utah (1896), and Arizona (1912), as well as, depending upon interpretation, the entire state of Texas (1845), which then included part of Kansas (1861); Colorado (1876); Wyoming (1890); Oklahoma (1907); and New Mexico (1912). The area of domain acquired was given by the Federal Interagency Committee as 338,680,960 acres. The cost was $16,295,149 or approximately 5 cents an acre. The remainder (the southern parts) of New Mexico and Arizona were peacefully acquired under the Gadsden Purchase, which was carried out in 1853. In this transfer the United States paid an additional $10 million (equivalent to $300 million in 2025) for land intended to accommodate a transcontinental railroad. However, the American Civil War delayed the construction of such a route, and it was not until 1881 that the Southern Pacific Railroad finally was completed as a second transcontinental railroad, fulfilling the purpose of the acquisition.

== Background to the war ==
Map of negotiation of the border between Mexico and the United States (1845-1848) as part of the American intervention in México.

Mexico had claimed the area in question since winning its independence from the Spanish Empire in 1821 following the Mexican War of Independence. The Spanish had conquered part of the area from the Indigenous peoples over the preceding three centuries. Still, powerful and independent Indigenous nations remained within that northern region of Mexico.

Most of that land was too dry and too mountainous to support a large population. About 80,000 Mexicans inhabited California, New Mexico, Arizona, and Texas during the period 1845 to 1850, with far fewer in Nevada, southern and western Colorado, and Utah. On 1 March 1845, U.S. president John Tyler signed legislation to authorize the United States to annex the Republic of Texas, effective on 29 December 1845. The Mexican government, which had never recognized the Republic of Texas as an independent country, had warned that annexation would be viewed as an act of war.

Both the United Kingdom and France recognized the Republic of Texas's independence and repeatedly tried to dissuade Mexico from declaring war against its northern neighbor. British efforts to mediate the quandary proved fruitless, in part because other political disputes (particularly the Oregon boundary dispute) arose between Great Britain (as the claimant of modern Canada) and the United States.

On 10 November 1845, before the outbreak of hostilities, President James K. Polk sent his envoy, John Slidell, to Mexico. Slidell had instructions to offer Mexico around $5 million for the territory of Nuevo México and up to $40 million for Alta California. The Mexican government dismissed Slidell, refusing to even meet with him. Earlier in that year, Mexico had broken off diplomatic relations with the United States, based partly on its interpretation of the Adams–Onís Treaty of 1819, under which newly independent Mexico claimed it had inherited rights. In that agreement, the United States had "renounced forever" all claims to Spanish territory.

Neither side took any further action to avoid a war. Meanwhile, Polk settled a major territorial dispute with Britain via the Oregon Treaty, which was signed on 15 June 1846. By avoiding any chance of conflict with Great Britain, the United States was given a free hand regarding Mexico. After the Thornton Affair of 25–26 April, when Mexican forces attacked an American unit in the disputed area, with the result that 11 Americans were killed, five wounded, and 49 captured, Congress passed a declaration of war, which Polk signed on 13 May 1846. The Mexican Congress, having already issued their own declaration of war on 23 April 1846.

== Conduct of war ==
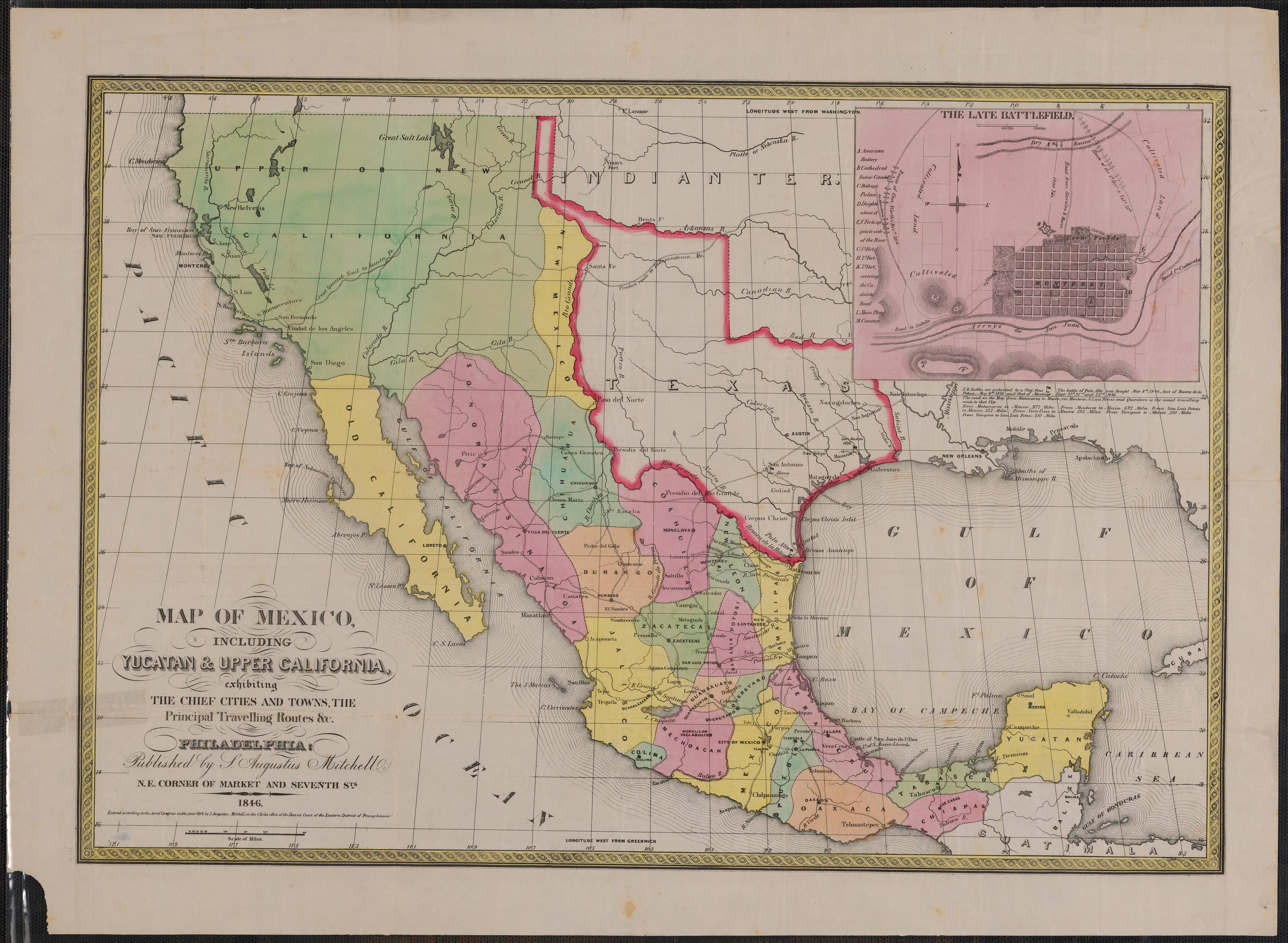
Map o. S. Augustus Mitchell, Philadelphia, 1847. Alta California shown including Nevada, Utah, and Arizona.

U.S. forces quickly moved beyond Texas to conquer Alta California and New Mexico. Fighting there ended on 13 January 1847 with the signing of the "Capitulation Agreement" at "Campo de Cahuenga" and the end of the Taos Revolt. By the middle of September 1847, U.S. forces had successfully invaded central Mexico and occupied Mexico City.

=== Peace negotiations ===
Some Eastern Democrats called for complete annexation of Mexico and recalled that a group of Mexico's leading citizens had invited General Winfield Scott to become dictator of Mexico after his capture of Mexico City (he declined). However, the movement did not draw widespread support. President Polk's State of the Union address in December 1847 upheld Mexican independence and argued at length that occupation and any further military operations in Mexico were aimed at securing a treaty ceding California and New Mexico up to approximately the 32nd parallel north and possibly Baja California and transit rights across the Isthmus of Tehuantepec.

Despite several military defeats, the Mexican government was reluctant to agree to the loss of California and New Mexico. Even with its capital under enemy occupation, the Mexican government was inclined to consider factors such as the unwillingness of the U.S. administration to annex Mexico outright and what appeared to be deep divisions in domestic U.S. opinion regarding the war and its aims, which caused it to imagine that it was actually in a far better negotiating position than the military situation might have suggested. A further consideration was the growing opposition to slavery that had caused Mexico to end formal slavery in 1829 and its awareness of the well-known and growing sectional divide in the U.S. over the issue of slavery. It, therefore, made sense for Mexico to negotiate to play Northern U.S. interests against Southern U.S. interests.

The Mexican negotiators also had intercepted a secret letter from Secretary of State Buchanan to Trist reiterating that annexing Baja California and acquiring American transit rights in the Isthmus of Tehuantepec were expendable American demands. With that knowledge, the Mexicans steadfastly refused to budge on either issue. (Chamberlin, Eugene [1963])

The Mexicans proposed peace terms that offered only the sale of Alta California north of the 37th parallel north — north of Santa Cruz, California, and Madera, California, and the southern boundaries of today's Utah and Colorado. Anglo-American settlers already dominated this territory, but perhaps more importantly from the Mexican point of view, it represented the bulk of pre-war Mexican territory north of the Missouri Compromise line of parallel 36°30′ north — lands that, if annexed by the United States, would have been presumed by Northerners to be forever free of slavery. The Mexicans also offered to recognize the freedom of Texas from Mexican rule and its right to join the Union but held to its demand of the Nueces River as a boundary.

While the Mexican government could not reasonably have expected the Polk Administration to accept such terms, it would have had reason to hope that a rejection of peace terms so favorable to Northern interests might have the potential to provoke sectional conflict in the United States or perhaps even a civil war that would fatally undermine the U.S. military position in Mexico. Instead, these terms, combined with other Mexican demands (in particular, for various indemnities), only provoked widespread indignation throughout the United States without causing the sectional conflict the Mexicans hoped for.

Jefferson Davis advised Polk that if Mexico appointed commissioners to come to the United States, the government that appointed them would probably be overthrown before they completed their mission, and they would likely be shot as traitors on their return; so that the only hope of peace was to have a U.S. representative in Mexico. Nicholas Trist, chief clerk of the State Department under President Polk, finally negotiated a treaty with the Mexican delegation after ignoring his recall by President Polk in frustration with the failure to secure a treaty. Notwithstanding that the treaty had been negotiated against his instructions, given its achievement of the major American aim, President Polk passed it on to the Senate.

The Treaty of Guadalupe Hidalgo was signed by Nicholas Trist (on behalf of the United States) and Luis G. Cuevas, Bernardo Couto, and Miguel Atristain as plenipotentiary representatives of Mexico on 2 February 1848 at the main altar of the old Basilica of Guadalupe at Villa Hidalgo (within the present city limits) as U.S. troops under the command of Gen. Winfield Scott were occupying Mexico City.

=== Debate in the American Congress ===
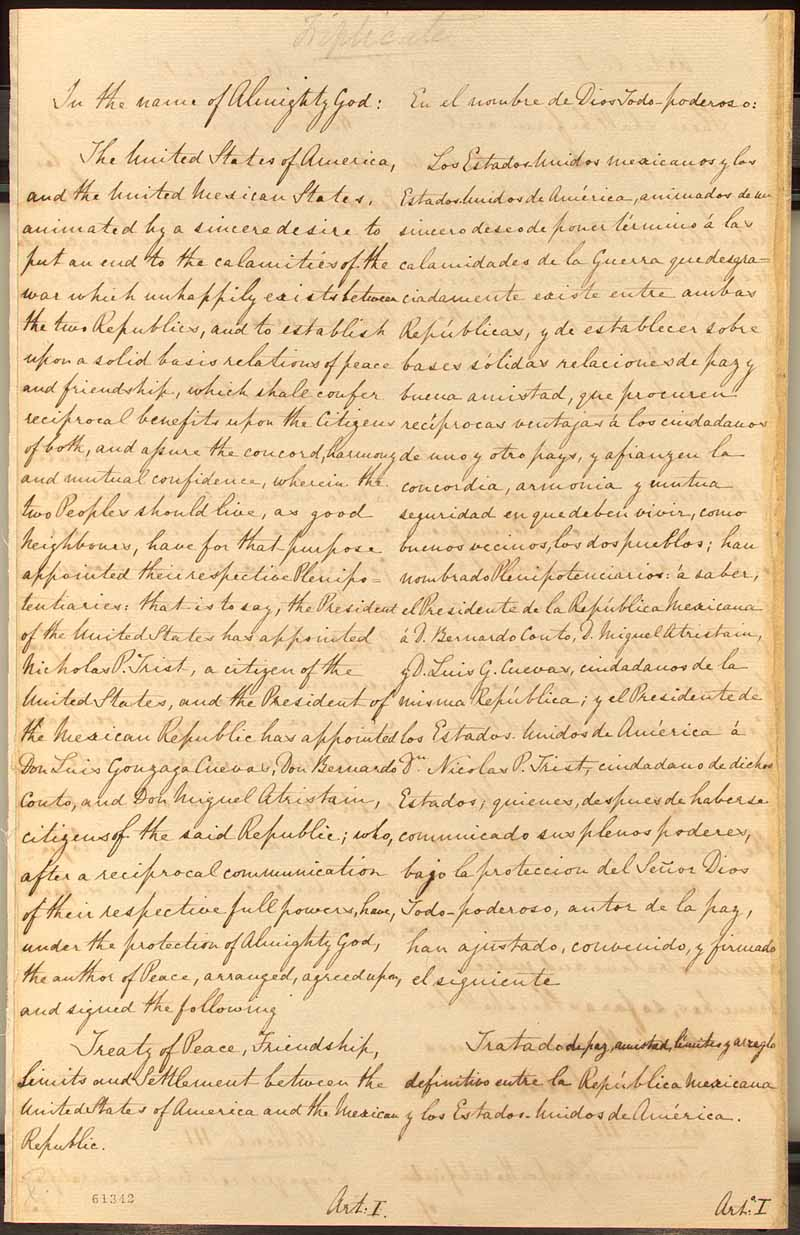
First page of the original treaty

The version of the treaty ratified by the United States Senate eliminated Article X, which stated that the U.S. government would honor and guarantee all land grants awarded in lands ceded to the United States by those respective governments to citizens of Spain and Mexico. Article VIII guaranteed that Mexicans who remained more than one year in the ceded lands would automatically become full-fledged United States citizens (or they could declare their intention of remaining Mexican citizens); however, the Senate modified Article IX, changing the first paragraph and excluding the last two. Among the changes was that Mexican citizens would "be admitted at the proper time (to be judged of by the Congress of the United States)" instead of "admitted as soon as possible", as negotiated between Trist and the Mexican delegation.

An amendment by Jefferson Davis giving the United States most of Tamaulipas and Nuevo León, all of Coahuila, and a large part of Chihuahua was supported by both senators from Texas (Sam Houston and Thomas Jefferson Rusk), Daniel S. Dickinson of New York, Stephen A. Douglas of Illinois, Edward A. Hannegan of Indiana, and one each from Alabama, Florida, Mississippi, Ohio, Missouri, and Tennessee. Most of the leaders of the Democratic party, Thomas Hart Benton, John C. Calhoun, Herschel V. Johnson, Lewis Cass, James Murray Mason of Virginia and Ambrose Hundley Sevier were opposed, and the amendment was defeated 44–11.

An amendment by Whig Sen. George Edmund Badger of North Carolina to exclude New Mexico and California lost 35–15, with three Southern Whigs voting with the Democrats. Daniel Webster was bitter that four New England senators made deciding votes for acquiring the new territories.

A motion to insert into the treaty the Wilmot Proviso (banning slavery from the acquired territories) failed 15–38 on sectional lines.

The treaty was leaked to John Nugent before the U.S. Senate could approve it. Nugent published his article in the New York Herald and, afterward, was questioned by senators. He was detained in a Senate committee room for one month, though he continued to file articles for his newspaper and ate and slept at the home of the sergeant at arms. Nugent did not reveal his source, and senators eventually gave up their efforts.

The treaty was subsequently ratified by the U.S. Senate by a vote of 38 to 14 on 10 March 1848 and by Mexico through a legislative vote of 51 to 34 and a Senate vote of 33 to 4, on 19 May 1848. News that New Mexico's legislative assembly had just passed an act for the organization of a U.S. territorial government helped ease Mexican concern about abandoning the people of New Mexico. The treaty was formally proclaimed on 4 July 1848.

=== Debate in the Mexican Congress ===
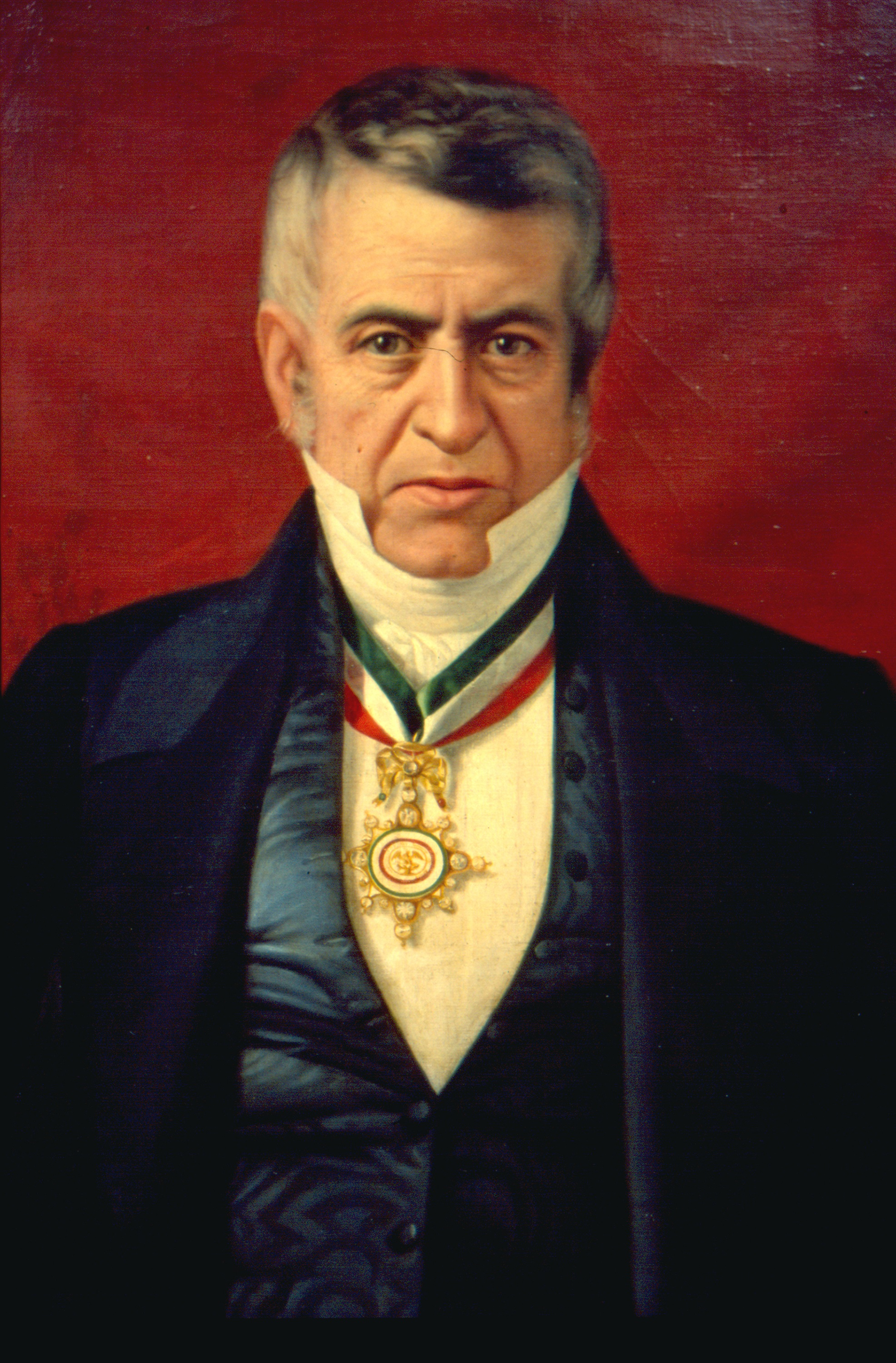
President Manuel de la Peña y Peña

The Mexican Congress and President Manuel de la Peña y Peña met at Querétaro City in May 1848, while Mexico City was occupied, and were now faced with the task of negotiating the treaty while dealing with separatism and anarchy spreading throughout the country. The Caste War was ongoing in Yucatán, and the insurgents in that conflict had occupied the major cities. Many states considered the federal government to be an enemy and refused to pay taxes. Meanwhile, most notably in the Federal District, there was a Mexican element advocating annexation of the entire country to the United States.

The majority of Congress supported the government's peace policy, seeing the proposed Treaty of Guadalupe as nothing but the unfortunate result of a poorly fought war, and therefore a national necessity. A foreign relations commission returned affirmative answers to two questions that Congress had directed it to report upon: May the government with the consent of Congress cede a portion of territory? Is it suitable to make peace upon the terms which have been proposed? The first question was resolved based upon the principle that congress was the deposit of the national sovereignty. The second question was resolved upon the consideration that Mexico had never been in full possession of the territories that were about to be ceded, and that most of that land was either not populated, or populated by hostile indigenous tribes. It was also taken into account that Mexico could not continue the war without facing certain defeat and risking the loss of the entire country. After the commission reported its findings, the Treaty of Guadalupe Hidalgo was approved by Congress. President Peña y Peña prepared decrees to prevent disorder in the capital once the occupiers left and to establish a national guard. On 26 May 1848, the government received US commissioners Nathan Clifford and Ambrose Hundley Sevier, sent to Mexico to consummate the treaty after Congress had approved it with some slight modifications.

Meanwhile, the President had to deal with guerilla warfare throughout the country afflicting both the American occupiers and Mexican merchants. The aim of the guerillas was to disrupt the American supply chain from Veracruz to the capital. This was also leading to indiscriminate American reprisals. As the peace treaty was concluded and the occupiers were on the point of leaving the country, Congress named Jose Joaquin Herrera to the presidency of the republic. Peña y Peña left his post as president in exchange for the presidency of the Supreme Court on 3 June 1848. The government left Querétaro and returned to the capital.

=== Protocol of Querétaro ===
On 30 May 1848, when the two countries exchanged ratifications of the treaty of Guadalupe Hidalgo, they further negotiated a three-article protocol to explain the amendments. The first article stated that the original Article IX of the treaty, although replaced by Article III of the Treaty of Louisiana, would still confer the rights delineated in Article IX. The second article confirmed the legitimacy of land grants pursuant to Mexican law.

The protocol further noted that the Mexican Minister of Foreign Affairs had accepted said explanations on behalf of the Mexican Government, and was signed in Querétaro by A. H. Sevier, Nathan Clifford and Luis de la Rosa.

The United States would later ignore the protocol on the grounds that the U.S. representatives had over-reached their authority in agreeing to it.

=== Treaty of Mesilla ===
The Treaty of Mesilla, which concluded the Gadsden purchase of 1854, had significant implications for the Treaty of Guadalupe Hidalgo. Article II of the treaty annulled article XI of the Treaty of Guadalupe Hidalgo, and article IV further annulled articles VI and VII of Guadalupe Hidalgo. Article V, however, reaffirmed the property guarantees of Guadalupe Hidalgo, specifically those contained within articles VIII and IX.

== Effects ==
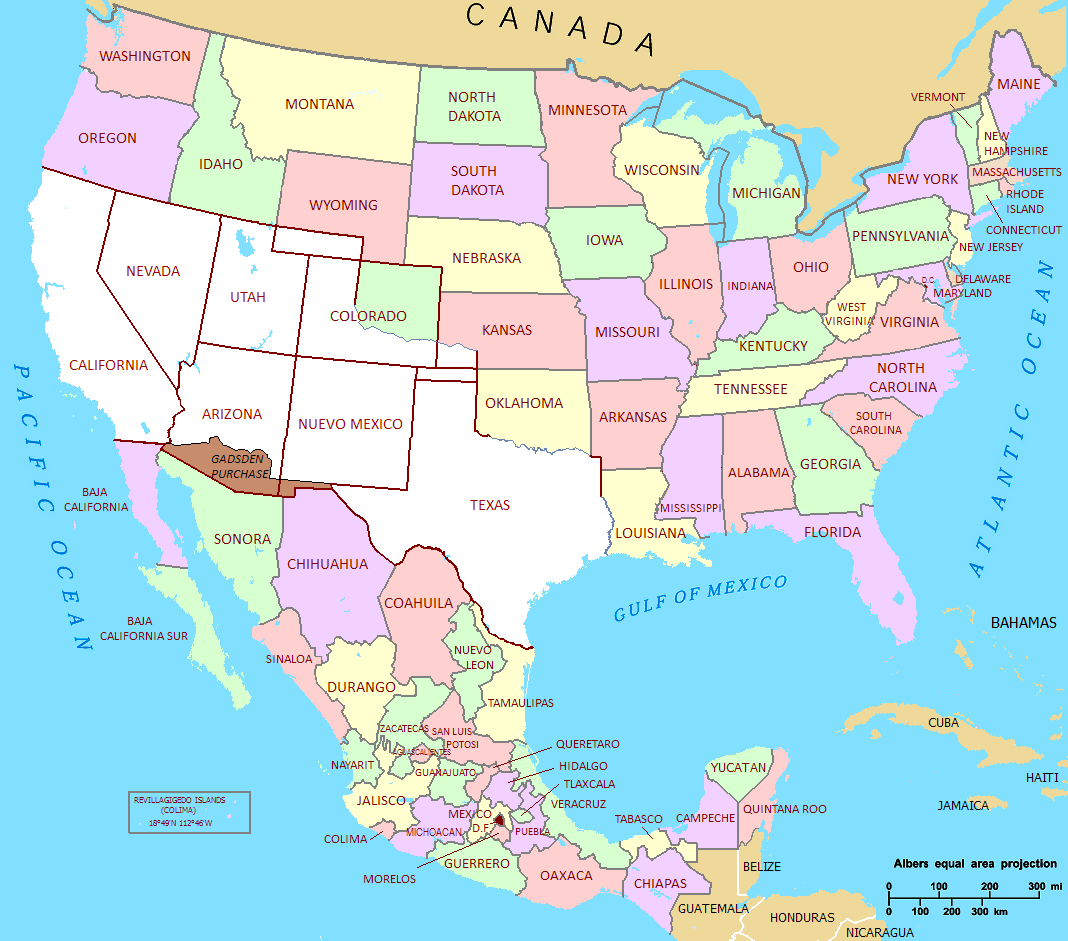
The Mexican Cession agreed with Mexico (white) and the Gadsden Purchase (brown). Part of the area marked as Gadsden Purchase near modern-day Mesilla, New Mexico, was disputed after the Treaty.

In addition to the sale of land, the treaty also provided recognition of the Rio Grande as the boundary between the state of Texas and Mexico. The land boundaries were established by a survey team of appointed Mexican and American representatives, and published in three volumes as the United States and Mexican Boundary Survey. On 30 December 1853, the countries, by agreement, altered the border from the initial one by increasing the number of border markers from 6 to 53. Most of these markers were simply piles of stones. Two later conventions, in 1882 and 1889, further clarified the boundaries, as some of the markers had been moved or destroyed. Photographers were brought in to document the location of the markers. These photographs are in Record Group 77, Records of the Office of the Chief Engineers, in the National Archives.

The southern border of California was designated as a line from the junction of the Colorado and Gila rivers westward to the Pacific Ocean so that it passes one Spanish league south of the southernmost portion of San Diego Bay. This was done to ensure that the United States received San Diego and its excellent natural harbor.

The treaty extended the choice of U.S. citizenship to Mexicans in the newly purchased territories before many African Americans, Asians, and Native Americans were eligible. If they chose to, they had to declare to the U.S. government within a year of the Treaty being signed; otherwise, they could remain Mexican citizens, but they would have to relocate. Between 1850 and 1920, the U.S. Census counted most Mexicans as racially "white".

Community property rights in California and other western states are based on the Visigothic Code which Spain adopted and then brought to the Americas, including the former territories of Mexico that were ceded to the U.S. Although each state had different motivations for adopting the Spanish approach, one common driver was that it was already in place in the region for many years. According to a 2011 assessment, changing to a common law system for marital property "would have been nothing short of a revolution".

=== Land gained by the United States ===
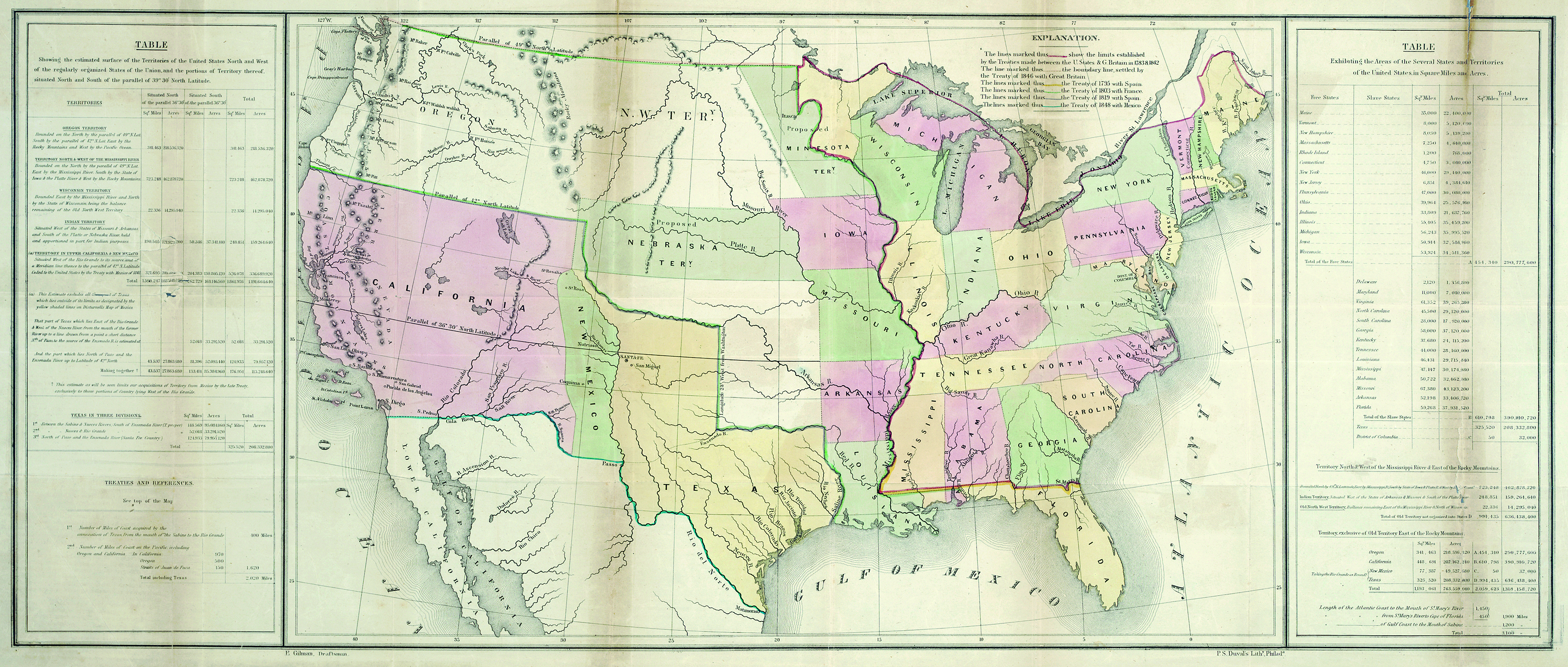
E. Gilman, [United States (after the Treaty of Guadalupe Hidalgo)], 1848

The United States received the territories of Alta California and Santa Fe de Nuevo México. Today they comprise some or all of the U.S. states of Arizona, California, Colorado, Nevada, New Mexico, Utah, and Wyoming. While this land was vast in area, most of it was very sparsely populated, inhabited mostly by Indigenous Americans, rather than white Americans or Mexicans.

== Subsequent issues ==
Additional issues stemming from the treaty included contention over slavery, border disputes with Mexico, mapping difficulties, cross-border incursions by both nations, community land grant claims, and water rights assignment between the two nations.

Disputes about whether to make all this new territory into slave states or free states, including Bleeding Kansas, contributed heavily to the rise in North–South tensions that led to the American Civil War just over a decade later.

Following the signing of the treaty, border disputes continued, with the United States sending envoy James Gadsden to negotiate the sale of additional territory to the US. In 1853, American filibuster William Walker led an unauthorized expedition into Baja California and Sonora, proclaiming the short-lived Republic of Lower California with the aim of being annexed by the United States. Although Walker's unrecognized state collapsed in January 1854, Mexican president Antonio Lopez de Santa Anna continued to see the US as a threat amid Mexico's persisting economic problems. Desiring to stave off American expansionist desires as well as alleviate domestic financial problems, Santa Anna sought to sell an area as small as possible to the US for as much money as possible, leading to the controversial $15 million Gadsden Purchase in 1854.

The border commission also faced many difficulties in mapping out the boundary, with the surveying process lasting over 7 years. The work of the commission was hampered by a multitude of issues including: transportation difficulties, unforgiving terrain, extreme weather, inaccurate information and negotiations with Indigenous Americans who had not been considered in the prior treaty negotiations.

The financial cost of enforcing Article XI was significant, becoming higher than the cost of the original treaty. In New Mexico alone military spending rose to $12 million between 1848 and 1853, and the Mexican government presented claims of damages of over $31 million to the US in 1868.

=== Civil War and later ===
The armed forces of both countries routinely crossed the border. Mexican and Confederate troops often clashed during the American Civil War, and the United States crossed the border during the war of second French intervention in Mexico. In March 1916, Pancho Villa led a raid on the U.S. border town of Columbus, New Mexico, which was followed by the Pershing expedition. The shifting of the Rio Grande since the signing of the Treaty of Guadalupe caused a dispute over the boundary between the states of New Mexico and Texas, a case referred to as the Country Club Dispute that was decided by the U.S. Supreme Court in 1927.

Controversy over community land grant claims in New Mexico persists to this day. The Channel Islands of California and Farallon Islands are not mentioned in the Treaty.

The Treaty of Guadalupe Hidalgo led to the establishment in 1889 of the International Boundary and Water Commission to maintain the border and, according to newer treaties, to allocate river waters between the two nations and to provide for flood control and water sanitation. Once viewed as a model of international cooperation, in recent decades, the IBWC has been heavily criticized as an institutional anachronism, bypassed by modern social, environmental, and political issues.

Writing many years later, Nicholas Trist would describe the Treaty as "a thing for every right-minded American to be ashamed of".

== See also ==
- Bibliography of the Mexican American War
- Timeline of the Mexican American War
- Outline of the Mexican American War
- 1848 in Mexico
- Annexation Bill of 1866
- Becoming white thesis
- Californios in literature
- Gadsden Purchase
- Treaty of Cahuenga
- Treaty of Guadalupe Hidalgo (History of New Mexico)
- Bibliography of California history

Aboriginal title

- Aboriginal title in California
- Aboriginal title in New Mexico
- In Re Ricardo Rodriguez

== Sources and further reading ==
- Davenport, John C. (2005). The U.S.-Mexico Border: The Treaty of Guadalupe Hidalgo. Philadelphia: Chelsea House. ISBN 0-7910-7833-7.
- Klein, Julius (1905). The making of the treaty of Guadalupe Hidalgo, on February 2, 1848. Berkeley, The University press.
- Morrison, Michael A. Slavery and the American West: The Eclipse of Manifest Destiny (1999)
- Ohrt, Wallace (1997). Defiant Peacemaker: Nicholas Trist in the Mexican War. College Station: Texas A&M University Press. ISBN 0-89096-778-4.
- Pinheiro, John C. " 'Religion without Restriction': Anti-Catholicism, All Mexico, and the Treaty of Guadalupe Hidalgo." Journal of the Early Republic 23.1 (2003): 69–96. online
- Reeves, Jesse S. (1905). "The Treaty of Guadalupe Hidalgo". American Historical Review. 10 (2): 309–324. doi:10.2307/1834723. hdl:10217/189496. JSTOR 1834723.
- Rives, George Lockhart (1913). The United States and Mexico, 1821–1848: a history of the relations between the two countries from the independence of Mexico to the close of the war with the United States. Vol. 2. New York: C. Scribner's Sons.
- Sears, Louis Martin. "Nicholas P. Trist, A Diplomat with Ideals." Mississippi Valley Historical Review11#1 (1924): 85–98. online
- Varg, Paul A. United States Foreign Relations, 1820-1860 (Michigan State UP, 1979) pp. 168–194.
- Velazquez-Flores, Rafael. "Mexico's Foreign Policy in the Nineteenth Century: The Origins of Principled Pragmatism, 1821–1853." in Principled Pragmatism in Mexico's Foreign Policy: Variables and Assumptions (Cham: Springer International Publishing, 2022). 33–47.
- Wyllys, Rufus Kay (1933). "The Republic of Lower California, 1853-1854". Pacific Historical Review. 2 (2): 194–213. doi:10.2307/3633829. ISSN 0030-8684. JSTOR 3633829.
- Chamberlin, Eugene (1963). "Nicholas Trist and Baja California". Pacific Historical Review. 32 (1): 49–63. doi:10.2307/4492128. JSTOR 4492128.
