= George P. Dow =

U.S. Medal of Honor recipient

George Parsons Dow
- Born: August 7, 1840; Atkinson, New Hampshire
- Died: September 28, 1910 (aged 70)
- Burial place: Atkinson, New Hampshire
- Military career
- Allegiance: United States
- Branch: United States Army
- Rank: First Sergeant
- Unit: 7th New Hampshire Volunteer Infantry
- Conflicts: American Civil War
- Awards: Medal of Honor

George Parsons Dow (August 7, 1840 – September 28, 1910) was a Union Army sergeant in the American Civil War, notable for receiving the Medal of Honor.

== Birth ==
Dow was born on August 7, 1840, in Atkinson, New Hampshire, and was living in the city of Manchester when he joined the Union Army.

== Military career ==
Dow's identity badge is in a well known private collection. He was a member of the 7th New Hampshire Volunteer Infantry, Company C, and received the Medal of Honor for "Gallantry in command of his company during a reconnaissance toward Richmond."

This mission occurred in October 1864. The 7th New Hampshire stood in a single line so that they could see the enemy and collect information regarding the strength of the Confederate defense. Dow later described his experience:

"Advancing, we came to a large stream and a bridge over which I led my company. We marched on, but the cannonading was so terrific that we could not hear the bugle from which we were to take orders. Still we advanced till we came to a clearing and presently found ourselves in front of the rebel breastworks mounted with guns and large bodies of infantry lying behind them. For some reason or other the enemy did not open on us. We halted and it was then that I made the startling discovery that my company had been separated from the regiment, which, as I afterward learned, had stopped at the stream. There was but one way out of our dangerous situation; we had to retreat. I gave the order, but in the roar of cannons and the smoke of firing we became confused and we missed the bridge and had to swim the stream. After thus crossing the water we marched for some distance and finally arrived at a farm house, where we found a woman apparently only too willing to help us find our way. 'Which direction has our line of battle taken?' I asked her. She pointed toward Richmond. I knew she was not telling the truth and took my company in an opposite direction. A little later we met one of our aides, who warned us that we were in danger of being gobbled up by the enemy's cavalry, so we started at a double quick and found the regiment drawn up in the woods. My company in this advance had got nearer to Richmond than any Union troops had yet done, and the information we brought back was of great importance to the Army of the James."

== Death ==
He died at age 70 on September 28, 1910, and was buried in his hometown of Atkinson, New Hampshire.

== See also ==
- List of American Civil War Medal of Honor recipients: A–F
