= Dow v. United States =

1915 United States Court of Appeals for the Fourth Circuit case

- Court: United States Court of Appeals for the Fourth Circuit
- Decided: Sept. 15 1915
- Citation: 226 F. 145

Case history
- Prior history: Ex Parte Dow (1914), In re Dow (1914)

Holding
- Court held that residents originating from Syria were considered racially "white", and therefore eligible to become naturalized US citizens

Court membership
- Judge sitting: Charles Albert Woods

Dow v. United States, 226 F. 145 (4th Cir., 1915), is a United States Court of Appeals, Fourth Circuit, case in which a Lebanese Maronite immigrant, George Dow, appealed two lower court decisions denying his application for naturalization as a United States citizen. Following the lower court decisions in Ex Parte Dow (1914) and In re Dow (1914), Dow v. United States resulted in the Circuit Court's affirmation of the petitioner's right to naturalize based, in the words of Circuit Judge Charles Albert Woods, on "the generally received opinion . . . that the inhabitants of a portion of Asia, including Syria and Lebanon, [are] to be classed as white persons".

George Dow's gauntlet through the American legal system, and the language with which his petition for citizenship was dealt, illustrate the degree to which legal bodies struggled to classify new groups of immigrants in a racial schema which would ultimately determine these immigrants' right to become American citizens.

== Race-based immigration law before Dow v. United States ==
Racial limitations to American immigration originated with the Naturalization Act of 1790, which defined eligibility for citizenship as confined to "any alien, being a free white person who shall have resided within the limits . . . of the United States for a term of two years". While the abolition of slavery resulted in a codicil to this policy in 1870 granting people "of African nativity or African descent" the right to naturalize, a series of prohibitive laws including the Page Act of 1875, the Chinese Exclusion Act of 1882, and the Alien Contract Labor Law of 1885 further restricted immigration from Asia based on race and class ideology. The Chinese Exclusion Act, as noted by Erika Lee, is remarkable for "establish[ing] Chinese—categorized by their race, class, and gender relations as the ultimate category of undesirable immigrants—as the models by which to measure the desirability (and 'whiteness') of other immigrant groups". It is precisely this metric of "whiteness" which would be contested in dozens of court cases asserting the right of immigrants who did not fit neatly into a black/white racial schema to naturalize.

=== Naturalization cases prior to Dow v. United States ===
Several naturalization cases prior to Dow v. United States were decided based on what historians called the applicants' "racial prerequisites". Within these cases, judicial opinion as to how to appropriately measure a petitioner's "whiteness" was split between justices using "common knowledge rationales, appeal[ing] to popular, widely held conceptions of races and racial divisions", and "scientific evidence" rationales, which "justified racial divisions by reference to the naturalistic studies of humankind". Both rationales were used to exclude applicants for naturalization in the case of In re Ah Yup (1878), as well as in the United States Supreme Court case Ozawa v. United States.

=== Syrian immigration cases prior to Dow v. United States ===
In the case of Syrian immigration, the "whiteness" of applicants had been affirmed in In re Najour (1909), In re Mudarri (1910), In re Ellis (1910), and Ex Parte Shahid (1913). In the case of In re Najour, the petitioner's application for citizenship was granted based on a "scientific evidence" rationale. In his opinion on the case, District Judge Newman argued that the term "free white persons" "refers to race, rather than to color, and fair or dark complexion should not be allowed to control, provided the person seeking naturalization comes within the classification of the white or Caucasian race". Conversely, both Ex Parte Shahid and Ex Parte Dow were decided using "common knowledge" rhetoric. In Ex Parte Shahid, District Judge Henry Smith, although ultimately denying Shahid's application based on the petitioner's illiteracy, also alluded to racial ineligibility, writing with regard to the Naturalization Act of 1790: "It is safest to follow the reasonable construction of the statute . . . and understand it as restricting the words 'free white persons' to mean persons as then understood to be of European habitancy or descent".

=== Efforts by Syrian-Americans ===
Many Syrians saw the rulings prior to Dow v. United States and general consensus as an insult to their character. There was an understanding among the Syrians and former Ottoman subjects that whiteness was very important in the United States. In immigration records, they were originally categorized as white, and they realized it was important to keep this status. For example, Elkourie, a physician and president of the Syrian Young Men's Society in Birmingham, Alabama, stated that the Syrians were semitic and, since most Jews at the time coming from Europe were considered semitic and white, Asian Semites should be considered white as well. This was Elkourie's way of persuading Americans that whiteness is more than just skin color, but character. He stated that "[the] Semitic was the original civilizer, developer, and intermediator of culture and learning" in order to appeal to those who believed those hailing from Asia were uncivilized. Therefore, a majority of Syrian-Americans saw the consensus that Syrians were not white as a sort of mistake that needed correcting.

== Ex Parte Dow ==
Ex Parte Dow was decided on February 18, 1914, in District Court, E.D. South Carolina. Henry Smith, the same presiding District Judge who had ruled a year earlier in Ex Parte Shahid, denied Dow's application for citizenship based on a rejection of the "scientific evidence" that Syrians are Caucasian. In his opinion on the case, District Judge Smith states with regard to the association of "whiteness" with "Caucasian," "it is based upon a construction which would exclude some people generally known and termed as white, and include those who have been always considered as not forming a part of the white race". While the Judge admits that, unlike in the case of Ex Parte Shahid, the applicant had "performed all the necessary formalities and would apparently from his intelligence and degree of information of a general character be entitled to naturalization", he ultimately rejects Dow's petition for naturalization based on the fact that "the applicant is not that particular free white person to whom the act of Congress has donated the privilege of citizenship in this country with its accompanying duties and responsibilities".

== In re Dow ==
Following the ruling in Ex Parte Dow, members of Charleston, South Carolina's Syrian population organized fundraising and awareness campaigns to raise support for a judicial appeal. The resulting case, In re Dow, was decided on April 15, 1914, and followed the same ideological conflict between "scientific" and "common knowledge" of race. Arguments on behalf of the applicant focused on a contemporary understanding of anthropology and race which posited that Syrians are members of a "Semitic nation", and are therefore entitled to inclusion as members of the "Caucasian or white race". District Judge Henry Smith again demurred from this line of reasoning based on the assumption that "white persons", to the average citizen of the United States in 1790, would have meant Europeans. Using this "common knowledge" conceptualization of race, District Judge Henry Smith once again rejected George Dow's application for citizenship.

== Dow v. United States ==
In re Dow was appealed to the Circuit Court of Appeals, Fourth Circuit, and decided on September 14, 1915, as Dow v. United States. As in the two earlier cases in which application for citizenship was denied, the presiding judge in Dow v. United States accepted that, by the standards of the Naturalization Act of 1790, people of non-European descent would have been considered non-white and thus unable to naturalize as citizens of the United States. However, by merit of the fact that the standard of "free white persons" had been renewed in an 1875 immigration law, the presiding judge argued that contemporary understandings of racial definition could be admitted in cases focused on the "whiteness" of the applicant. Citing scientific evidence and congressional intent, the presiding judge argued that "at the date of the new acts and amendments . . . it seems to be true beyond question that the generally received opinion was that the inhabitants of a portion of Asia, including Syria, were to be classed as white persons", thereby overturning the lower court's decision to deny George Dow's application for US citizenship.

== Subsequent cases ==
The Dow case was an appellate court ruling, binding on District Court judges in the Fourth Circuit only, though occasionally cited outside of it. The US Supreme Court did not rule on the racial classification of Syrians or Arabs generally during the era when categorization as white was important in immigration law. As a result, some subsequent district court rulings outside the Fourth Circuit were mixed. In the 1942 case In re Ahmed Hassan, a district court judge in Michigan noted that a Yemenite immigrant was dark-skinned and found him ineligible for naturalization because the Arabian Peninsula was far from Europe, not even bordering the Mediterranean, and part of the "Mohammadan World". Conversely, in 1944, a District Court judge in Massachusetts ruled in Ex Parte Mohriez that Mohamed Mohriez was eligible for naturalization although he was from the Arabian Peninsula, noting this was generally the practice of the Immigration and Naturalization Service at the time.
