= In Re Ricardo Rodriguez =

- Court: U.S. District Court Western District of Texas
- Decided: May 3, 1897

Court membership
- Judge sitting: Thomas Shelton Maxey

In Re Ricardo Rodriguez is a landmark civil rights and naturalization case decided in the U.S. District Court Western District of Texas (1897). In the United States, Mexicans occupied an ambiguous racial category in-between white and black because US naturalization laws only allowed for white and Black immigrants to become citizens. This case is important for Mexican and other Latin American immigrants because Judge Thomas S. Maxey declared that Mexicans were considered white for naturalization purposes. Judge Maxey further agreed that Ricardo Rodriguez was protected under the 14th Amendment.

== Background context ==
=== Key figures ===
Ricardo Rodriguez was originally from the state of Guanajuato, Mexico. Stated in the courts Rodriguez was an illiterate, thirty-seven-year-old laborer who spoke no English. When Rodriguez applied for naturalization in 1896 he had already lived in Texas for about 10 years. Rodriguez was a hardworking man who did not know much of Mexican history. In the amicus brief, all four of the lawyers involved all agreed that Rodriguez appeared as more Indian rather than Spanish (white). However, the case was centered more on voter eligibility than on racial naturalization, which was involved but not the primary issue.

The judge in the case was Thomas S. Maxey. Maxey received his law degrees from two different schools, the first being the University of Mississippi and the second was Tulane University. After the Rodriguez case in 1888, he went on to be appointed in United States district court for the Western District of Texas. When Rodriguez's application was submitted, Judge Maxey decided to form a committee hoping to have six lawyers to make an amicus brief; however, only four submitted cases. The four lawyers involved in the case were Theodore J. McMinn a populist, Andrew Jackson Evans a republican, McGown, and Thomas M. Paschal a democrat. The three lawyers who opposed Rodriguez in the case were McMinn, Evans and McGown. Paschal was the only lawyer that supported Rodriguez in the case.

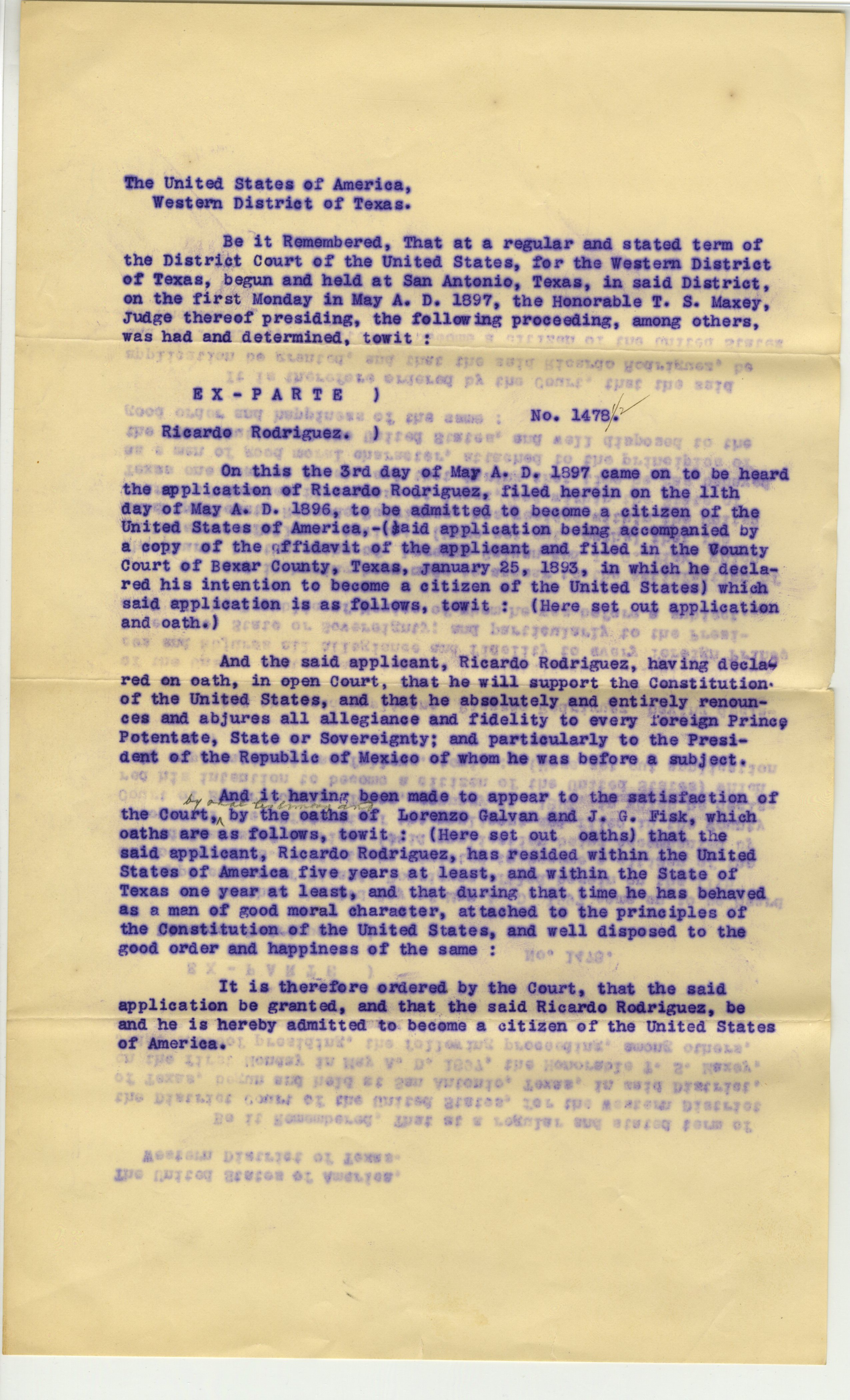
The 1897 ruling by Judge Thomas S. Maxey that granted Rodriguez citizenship

=== Legal and social context ===
Prior to the In Re Ricardo Rodriguez case, Mexicans occupied an ambiguous in-between legal position in the U.S. for nearly half a century because of the complex racial history of the Mexico-United States border region. Ethnic Mexicans came from diverse backgrounds, with the majority having a mix of Spanish, Indigenous, and African (Black) ancestry, commonly referred to as mestizo. In the period leading up to the In re Ricardo Rodriguez decision, U.S. naturalization laws allowed only white persons and persons of African descent to become naturalized citizens. The first U.S. naturalization statute of 1790 limited eligibility to “white” immigrants, and later legislation explicitly allowed naturalization for persons of African descent. Policymakers and courts debated if Mexicans should be classified as "white" under the law. Indigenous people were not permitted to gain U.S. citizenship or naturalize. Mexicans came from mixed Spanish (considered white) and Indigenous ancestry (which was considered as non-white and therefore not recognized for naturalization). The uncertainty over Mexicans' racial status combined with racist beliefs about the inequality of races created a legal ambiguity that was left to the courts to interpret.

The Treaty of Guadalupe Hidalgo ended the Mexican-American war. Mexico ceded approximately 55 percent of its territory to the United States including present day California, Utah, New Mexico, Arizona, Colorado, and Nevada. The treaty was signed on February 2, 1848. Through the transfer of land, the United States gained control of regions that had long been inhabited and established by mixed-race Mexican communities. Although the treaty included provisions guaranteeing land and civil rights protections to Mexicans living in the newly annexed areas, these provisions were often disregarded. U.S. Citizens argued that because Mexican immigrants were not "white" and came from Indian ancestry that they should not be granted citizenship. Even though the treaty Guadalupe Hidalgo granted civil rights to Mexicans, socially and legally they did face discrimination when trying to naturalize.

=== Political context ===
During the 1890s, there was opposition to voting rights for Mexicans within the Populist Party in Texas. The People's Party did not agree that Mexicans should be granted the right to naturalize or the right to vote. To achieve this milestone, they worked with various political figures in Texas in hopes of banning voting rights for Mexican communities.

The progress began with the 1894 election in Texas when the people's party wanted to make a name for themselves to gain more widespread popularity. During that election the people's party did well around Texas with their governor candidate, Thomas L. Nugent won about 152,731 votes which was about 36 percent of the voter population. After the election, a split within the Democratic Party and a majority of the Populist Party resulted in an agreement that they should “purify the votes,” with the goal of preventing Mexicans from obtaining the right to vote.

In 1895, politicians took the initiative to begin working on new legislation. Samuel B. McBride, a Democrat, introduced bills aimed at eliminating voting rights for Mexicans, and he had the support of the People's Party. Debate intensified within the government, leading to numerous arguments claiming that Mexicans should not have the right to vote because they supposedly “spoiled the electoral process.” Some argued that the issue was not racial but instead concerned the practice of naturalizing Mexicans on the same day as elections; however, these claims were not supported by evidence. The only bill that ultimately passed required that Mexicans be naturalized at least six months before election day in order to vote.

The People's Party continued to support McBride, hoping to achieve a full ban on Mexican naturalization. Members of the party then began seeking other ways to suppress Mexican voting rights. Instead of relying solely on legislation, they turned to the courts, beginning with Theodore J. McMinn, a People's Party member and attorney, who took the lead in pursuing this strategy. One day Ricardo Rodriguez applies for U.S. citizenship however, the record of Rodriguez's application ends up being opposed by two politicians and local lawyers which are Theodore J. McMinn a populist and Andrew Jackson Evans a republican.

== Case ==
=== Filings and arguments ===
In 1896, the legal dispute was formally introduced with Ricardo Rodriguez's formal petition for U.S. citizenship filed in the U.S. District Court for the Western District in Texas. Rodriguez argued that, as a Mexican immigrant within the United States, he was within his rights to be eligible for naturalization under federal law and the Treaty of Guadalupe Hidalgo. Legal Historians, such as Arnoldo De Leon, cite that petitions like Rodriguez's "relied on the long-standing federal practice of recognizing Mexicans as eligible for citizenship.” This was regarded by Rodriguez's counsel as a promise that foreign Mexican nationals were entitled to the rights of American citizens,” making them “white” in a legal sense, for naturalization purposes.

Opposition filings were eventually submitted by Populist Theodore J. McMinn and Republican Andrew Jackson Evans, both of whom intervened despite lacking direct standing within the case. Justice John G. Browning described the nature of their objective as an attempt to “establish that Mexicans of indigenous or mixed ancestry were “not white”. Historian Clare Sheridan notes their position reflected wider initiatives to inject “social concepts of race rather than strict legal or scientific definitions” into naturalization laws. Social anthropologist Martha Menchaca cites that these opponents deployed “local social prejudices into federal naturalization proceedings.”

In response, Rodriguez's attorneys filed challenges in court to both the racial argumentation and the political motivations that underscored them. His attorneys cited congressional precedent, diplomatic documents, as well as the treaty's language to demonstrate that the United States had previously “treated Mexicans as a naturalizable class.” Rodriguez's counsel, in tandem, challenged the very notion of racial classification. As historian Ariela J. Gross later points to, courts of the era routinely grappled with the “performative and inconsistent nature of racial classification”, an argument that aligned with Rodriguez's defense.

=== Hearing and public opinion ===
Because In re Ricardo Rodriguez was processed through a naturalization petition, the matter was heard unilaterally by Judge Thomas S. Maxey, without a jury.

According legal historian John G. Browning, McMinn and Evans transformed the case into “a broader test case over the racial classification of Mexicans”. Their filings were an attempt to introduce ethnological claims over precedent to prove that Rodriguez could not be legally white. Rodriguez's attorneys countered this line of attack by emphasizing treaty obligations and congressional precedent.

The case became a sharp divide in local communities. Menchaca writes that many Anglo Texans viewed Mexican immigrants with suspicion and supported efforts to restrict their political participation. Populist and Republican activists were angered by the court's willingness to even hear Rodriguez's petition, treating the case as part of a broader battle over racial boundaries. Mexican American communities saw the proceedings as “an affirmation of their rights under the Treaty of Guadalupe Hidalgo”.

=== Outcome ===
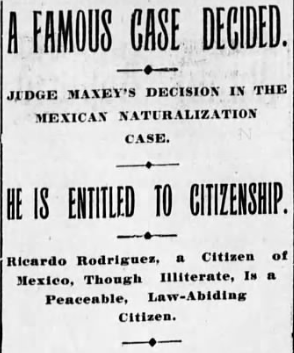
Statement indicating the result of the In Re Ricardo Rodriguez trial.

Judge Thomas S. Maxey ultimately decided to grant Ricardo Rodriguez his petition for U.S. citizenship. Maxey held that the Treaty of Guadalupe Hidalgo and decades of congressional precedent illustrated by Maxey, who, “affirmed that Mexicans had long been treated as a naturalizable class.” The court rejected racial arguments advanced by both McMinn and Evans. John G. Browning states that Maxey refused to allow, “racial pseudoscience nor local prejudice [to] override treaty obligations or federal precedent”. Maxey emphasized that Congress had never restricted the naturalization of Mexicans and that forcefully reclassifying them as nonwhite individuals would contradict decades of statutes. Legal historian Ian Haney Lopez argues that In re Ricardo Rodriguez exemplified how courts “constructed whiteness as a legal status, rather than a biological identity.”

== Legacy ==
Judge Thomas S. Maxey ultimately decided to grant Ricardo Rodriguez his petition for U.S. citizenship. Maxey held that the Treaty of Guadalupe Hidalgo and decades of congressional precedent illustrated by Maxey, who, “affirmed that Mexicans had long been treated as a naturalizable class.”

The court rejected racial arguments advanced by both McMinn and Evans. John G. Browning states that Maxey refused to allow, “racial pseudoscience nor local prejudice [to] override treaty obligations or federal precedent”. Maxey emphasized that Congress had never restricted the naturalization of Mexicans and that forcefully reclassifying them as nonwhite individuals would contradict decades of statutes. Legal historian Ian Haney Lopez argues that In re Ricardo Rodriguez exemplified how courts “constructed whiteness as a legal status, rather than a biological identity.”

Immediately following the ruling, Mexican immigrants maintained an uninterrupted access to both naturalization and voting rights. The ruling of Justice Thomas S. Maxey directly blocked efforts of McMinn and Evans to bar Mexicans from citizenship, with scholars claiming that this decision directly preserved an emerging political influence in the region. Short term reactions were largely polarized. Scholars state that segments of the Anglo political establishment viewed the decision as an obstacle to restricting Mexican American political influence. Many scholars also held that long-term consequences of the ruling helped establish a racial logic that structured Mexican American civil rights struggles in the twentieth century. Other scholars, such as Gregg Cantrell, illustrated the result as a status of “technical whiteness” for Mexican Americans in the United States, meaning that Mexican Americans were legally white, but continued to face segregation and discrimination. Naturalization rates, for instance, remained significantly lower than many immigrants from Europe due to institutional racism.
