= Naturalization Act of 1870 =

United States federal law

Naturalization Act of 1867
- Long title: An Act to amend the Naturalization Laws and to punish Crimes against the same, and for other Purposes.
- Enacted by: the 41st United States Congress
- Effective: July 14, 1870

Citations
- Public law: Pub. L. 41–254
- Statutes at Large: 16 Stat. 254-256

Legislative history
- Introduced in the House as H.R. 2201 by Noah Davis (R–NY) on June 13, 1870; Passed the Senate on July 4, 1870 (33 - 8); Passed the House on July 11, 1870 (132 - 53); Signed into law by President Ulysses S. Grant on July 14, 1870

The Naturalization Act of 1870 (16 Stat. 254) was a United States federal law that created a system of controls for the naturalization process and penalties for fraudulent practices. It is also noted for extending the naturalization process to "aliens of African nativity and to persons of African descent" while also maintaining exclusion of the process to Chinese Americans and other Asian groups.

== Wong Kim Ark case ==
By virtue of the Fourteenth Amendment and despite the 1870 Act, the US Supreme Court in United States v. Wong Kim Ark (1898) recognized US birthright citizenship of an American-born child of Chinese parents who had a permanent domicile and residence in the United States, and who were there carrying on business, and were not employed in any diplomatic or official capacity under the Emperor of China. US citizenship of persons born in the United States since Wong Kim Ark have been recognized, although the Supreme Court has never directly made a ruling in relation to children born to parents who are not legal residents in the United States.

== Legislative history ==
The naturalization bill was introduced by Republican Representative Noah Davis from New York in the US House of Representatives as bill H.R. 2201 and Republican Senator Roscoe Conkling from New York co-sponsored the bill in the US Senate.

The 1870 Act was passed by the 41st US Congress and signed into law by President Ulysses S. Grant on July 14, 1870. Although the act was enacted in the US Congress during the Reconstruction era, it is often not noted among the group of major legislative bills passed and enacted during that time period.

== Bibliography ==
- Wang, Xi (1997). "Black Suffrage, Chinese Suffrage, and the Politics of Making the Naturalization Act of 1870". The Trial of Democracy: Black Suffrage and Northern Republicans, 1860-1910. Athens, Georgia: University of Georgia Press. pp. 68–78. ISBN 978-0-8203-1837-0. Provides a brief overview of the importance of the Naturalization Act of 1870 among Congressmen during the era of Reconstruction. It also traces the legislative history of bill H.R. 2201 in Congress during 1870.
