= In re Ah Yup =

1878 landmark US court decision

In re Ah Yup, 1 F. Cas. 223 (C.C.D. Cal. 1878) was an 1878 landmark court decision in the United States that deemed residents of Asian descent ineligible for naturalization. Since the existing laws allowed only for the naturalization of white people and black people, the Chinese plaintiff Ah Yup attempted to argue that Chinese people were white. A federal court in California dismissed this contention with reference to then current pseudoscientific and popular ideas about race, emphasizing that "Orientals" were unfit for participation in republican government because of the unsatisfactory political culture which existed in Asia at the time.

The decision is regarded as the first reported racial-prerequisite case in which courts determined immigrants’ eligibility for citizenship by interpreting racial categories in federal statutes. The case illustrates how United States naturalization law used race to determine who could become a citizen through naturalization. It also preceded the Chinese Exclusion Act of 1882, which restricted the entry of Chinese laborers and separately barred courts from naturalizing Chinese persons.

== Background ==
=== Racial Restriction on Naturalization ===
Congress enacted its first naturalization rule through the Naturalization Act of 1790. It provided that any “free white person” who resided “within the limits and under the jurisdiction of the United States” for at least two years could be granted citizenship if he or she showed good character and swore allegiance to the Constitution.

Following the adoption of the Thirteenth and Fourteenth Amendments, Congress enacted the Naturalization Act of 1870, extending the naturalization eligibility to persons of African nativity or descent. However, the restriction on other groups were unchanged.

In 1875, Congress amended Section 2169 of the revised statutes to standardize the individuals eligible for naturalization include only “Free White Persons” and persons of African nativity or descent.

=== Case classification ===
Prerequisite cases were cases based on racial restrictions on naturalization. The first reported prerequisite case was handed down in 1878. From 1878 until the end of racial restrictions on naturalization in 1952, fifty-one more prerequisite cases were decided in jurisdictions around the country, all the way from California to Washington D.C. All of these had to do with applicants from a variety of countries including, Canada, Mexico, Japan, the Philippines, India, and Syria. Almost all of these cases were instances where the applicants presented claims of white racial identity.

Ah Yup was the first prerequisite case. This case gave a sense of what to expect in future cases, as well as the reasoning that reflected almost every other prerequisite case that would be presented in the United States.

== History ==
Ah Yup was an ethnically Chinese immigrant who applied for naturalization. The petition stated that all of the qualifications required by the statute to entitle the petitioner to be naturalized were present, as long as the statute authorized the naturalization of a native of China of the "Mongolian race" (a term used at the time to include people from most Asian ethnic groups). The question then being posed by this case was, 'is a person of the Mongolian race a "white person" within the meaning of the statute?'

On April 29, 1878, the Ninth Circuit Court in California denied Ah Yup the right to naturalize. The court did this by citing the 1802 naturalization laws and all revised statutes that had been passed since. At the time of Ah Yup's petition, the laws granted all "free white persons" as well as all "aliens of African nativity, and persons of African descent" the right to naturalize. The court ruled that Mongolians could not be classified as "white", and made it clear that the existing provisions prevented all except "whites" and those of African descent from naturalizing to the United States.

== Ah Yup's Naturalization Petition ==
Ah Yup was a native and citizen of China who petitioned for naturalization to become a citizen of the United States. He falls within the Mongolian race. Ah Yup was represented by Attorney B. S. Brooks. He asserted that he satisfied the statutory requirement for naturalization.The legal questions identified by the Circuit Court of California are:

1. Is a person of the Mongolian race a “white person” within the meaning of the statute?

2. Do the Naturalization provisions exclude all but white persons and persons of African nativity or descent?

== Decision ==
Circuit Judge Lorenzo Sawyer presided over this case. He noted that this case constituted the first naturalization application by a person from China. Sawyer turned to evidence coming from science and that of amici curiae to assist the court in a decision. The evidence coming from science was based on contemporary anthropological thought on racial classifications. Judge Sawyer diligently reviewed the legislative history of the naturalization statute. He not only wanted to rely on the opinions of the amici, but also the scientific evidence as he searched for a clue to the meaning of the question of Chinese naturalization.

The judge carefully examined congressional debates that came about because of Senator Charles Sumner's opposition to racial restrictions. These debates directly dealt with and questioned Chinese naturalization. After careful consideration, Sawyer decided that he was "of the opinion that a native of China, of the Mongolian race, is not a white person" and due to this Ah Yup was denied citizenship to the United States of America.

== Subsequent Developments ==
=== Chinese Exclusion Act of 1882 ===
Four years after In re Ah Yup, Congress enacted the Chinese Exclusion Act of 1882, which suspended the immigration of Chinese labourers for ten years and imposed additional restrictions on Chinese immigration.

Section 14 of the Act expressly prohibited state and federal courts from admitting Chinese immigrants to citizenship through naturalization. Whereas In re Ah Yup had interpreted existing racial qualifications to exclude Chinese applicants, the Chinese Exclusion Act of 1882 established an explicit statutory prohibition against Chinese naturalization.

=== United States v. Wong Kim Ark (1898) ===
In United States v. Wong Kim Ark (1898), the Supreme Court considered whether a person born in the United States to Chinese immigrant parents acquired citizenship under the Citizenship Clause of the Fourteenth Amendment.

Wong Kim Ark was born in San Francisco to Chinese parents who were citizens of China and were domiciled in the United States. After returning from a visit to China, he was denied permission to enter the United States on the ground that he was not a United States citizen.

The Supreme Court held that Wong Kim Ark was a United States citizen by birth under the Fourteenth Amendment. The decision distinguished citizenship acquired by birth under the Constitution from naturalization governed by federal statutes.

Although Wong Kim Ark did not overturn In re Ah Yup, it established that the statutory restrictions on naturalization did not prevent persons born in the United States under the circumstances presented in the case from acquiring citizenship under the Fourteenth Amendment.

=== Ozawa v. United States (1922) ===
In Ozawa v. United States (1922), the Supreme Court held that Takao Ozawa, a Japanese-born applicant, was ineligible for naturalization under the “free white persons” requirement. The Court rejected a test based solely on an individual’s skin color and interpreted the statutory phrase as referring to persons of what was popularly considered the “Caucasian race.” In reaching that conclusion, the Court expressly cited In re Ah Yup as the starting point of a line of lower-court decisions concerning the meaning of “white person.”

=== United States v. Bhagat Singh Thind (1923) ===
In United States v. Bhagat Singh Thind (1923), the Supreme Court addressed the claim of an immigrant from India who argued that his ancestry placed him within the anthropological classification of “Caucasian.” The Court nevertheless held that he did not qualify as a “white person,” explaining that the statutory words should be understood according to common usage rather than a technical racial taxonomy.

=== Magnuson Act (1943) ===
In 1943, Congress enacted the Chinese Exclusion Repeal Act, commonly known as the Magnuson Act. The legislation repealed the Chinese exclusion laws and permitted Chinese immigrants to become naturalized American citizens.

The legislation was enacted during World War II, when China was an ally of the United States, fighting Japan and Germany. The exclusion laws had become a source of diplomatic tension between China and the United States, and their repeal was a result of the wartime cooperation.

The Magnuson Act removed the specific statutory barrier to Chinese naturalization that had been imposed by the Chinese Exclusion Act of 1882. Nevertheless, it maintained substantial immigration restrictions, including an annual immigration quota of approximately 105 Chinese immigrants.

=== Immigration and Nationality Act (1952) ===
The Immigration and Nationality Act of 1952, also known as the McCarran–Walter Act, eliminated the remaining racial restrictions on eligibility for naturalization in the United States.

Section 311 of the Act prohibited the denial or restriction of naturalization eligibility on the basis of race or sex. The legislation thus ended the racial eligibility requirements that had governed naturalization in In re Ah Yup and subsequent racial prerequisite cases.

Although the 1952 Act removed racial barriers to naturalization, it retained the national-origins quota system and other restrictions on immigration. The national-origins quota system was later eliminated through the Immigration and Nationality Act amendments of 1965.
