= White Fragility =

2018 book by Robin DiAngelo

White Fragility: Why It's So Hard for White People to Talk About Racism
- Front cover
- Author: Robin DiAngelo
- Language: English
- Subject: White fragility
- Publisher: Beacon Press
- Publication date: June 26, 2018
- Publication place: United States
- Pages: 192
- ISBN: 978-0-8070-4741-5
- OCLC: 1022084782
- Dewey Decimal: 305.8
- LC Class: HT1521 .D486 2018
- Followed by: Nice Racism

White Fragility: Why It's So Hard for White People to Talk About Racism is a 2018 book written by Robin DiAngelo about race relations in the United States. An academic with experience in diversity training, DiAngelo coined the term "white fragility" in 2011 to describe what she views as any defensive instincts or reactions that a white person experiences when questioned about race or made to consider their own race. In White Fragility, DiAngelo views racism in the United States as systemic and often perpetuated subconsciously by individuals. She recommends against viewing racism as committed intentionally by "bad people".

Published on June 26, 2018, by Beacon Press, the book entered the New York Times Bestseller List that month, remaining on the list for well over a year and experiencing a resurgence in demand during the George Floyd protests beginning in May 2020. As of the July 26, 2020, edition, the book was in its 97th week on the list in the Paperback Nonfiction category, where it was ranked number one. Critically, the book received generally positive reviews at the time of its publication. It received more mixed reviews in the aftermath of the George Floyd protests two years later. Some reviewers lauded the book for being thoughtful and instructive, but characterized it as diagnostic rather than solution-oriented. Other reviewers criticized the book for making false claims about race and racism in America, for putting whites in a situation where anything they say is used against them, for infantilizing black people, and for doing nothing to promote racial justice or combat systemic racism.

== Background ==
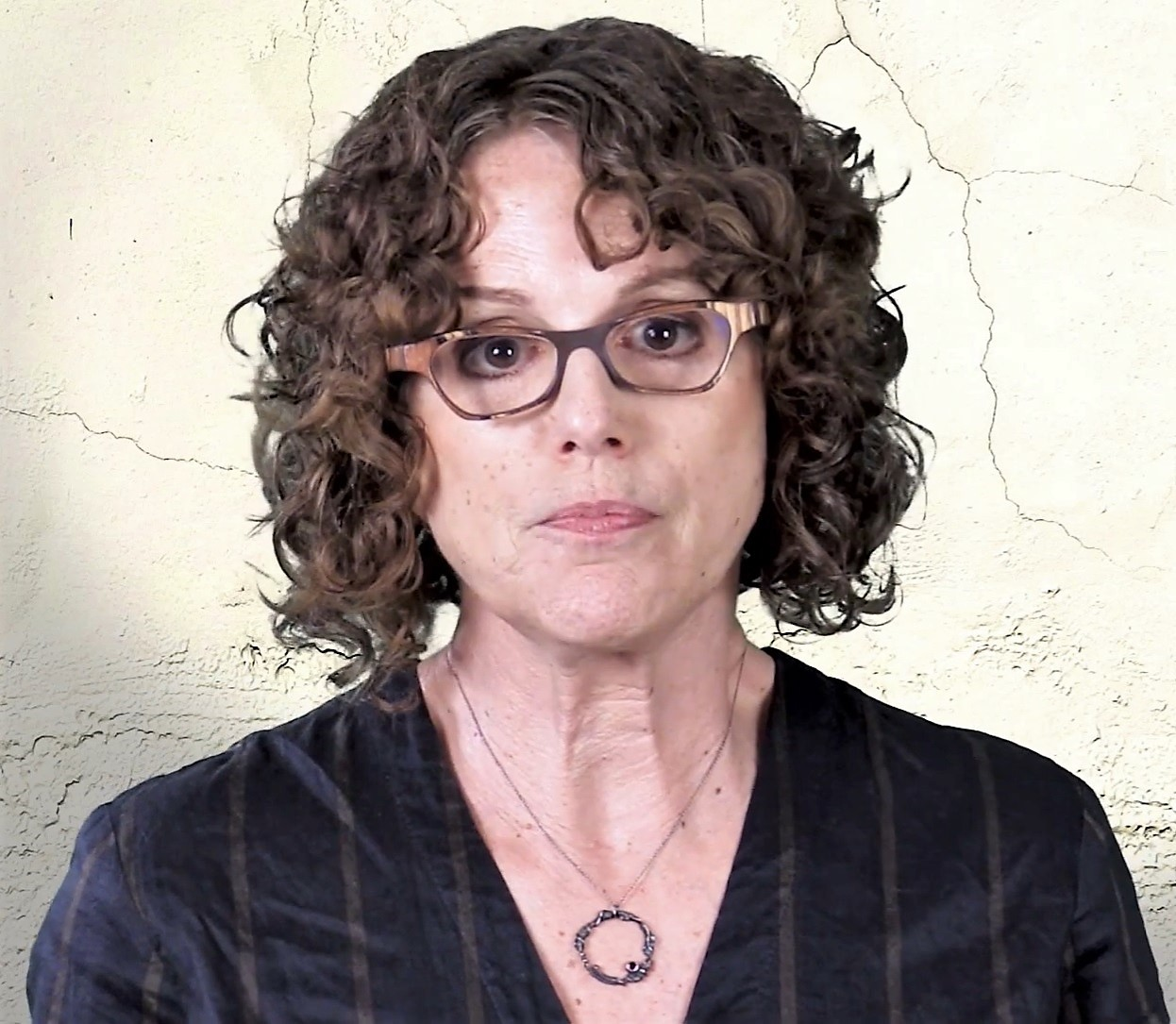
Author Robin DiAngelo in 2020

Author Robin DiAngelo is a white American academic. She worked for 20 years in providing diversity training for businesses. Identifying as "progressive" at the time, she found her view on race changing as she began working with people of color and experienced hostility from white people when talking about race during the training. After five years in the job, she began studying for a PhD in multicultural education at the University of Washington. DiAngelo became a tenured professor at Westfield State University, working in the areas of critical discourse analysis and whiteness studies. White Fragility draws heavily on her experiences in her diversity training job. The book is aimed at a white audience.

DiAngelo coined the term "white fragility" in 2011, to describe defensive behavior by a white person when their conception of racism is questioned. White Fragility is DiAngelo's third book, following What Does It Mean to Be White?: Developing White Racial Literacy (2012). White Fragility was published on June 26, 2018, by Beacon Press. To accompany the book, Beacon Press's website offers: a Reading Guide by DiAngelo and Özlem Sensoy; a Discussion Guide for Educators by Valeria Brown; and a Discussion Guide for Unitarian Universalist Association meetings by Gail Forsyth-Vail. The book was published in early 2019 in the United Kingdom by Penguin Books.

== Synopsis ==
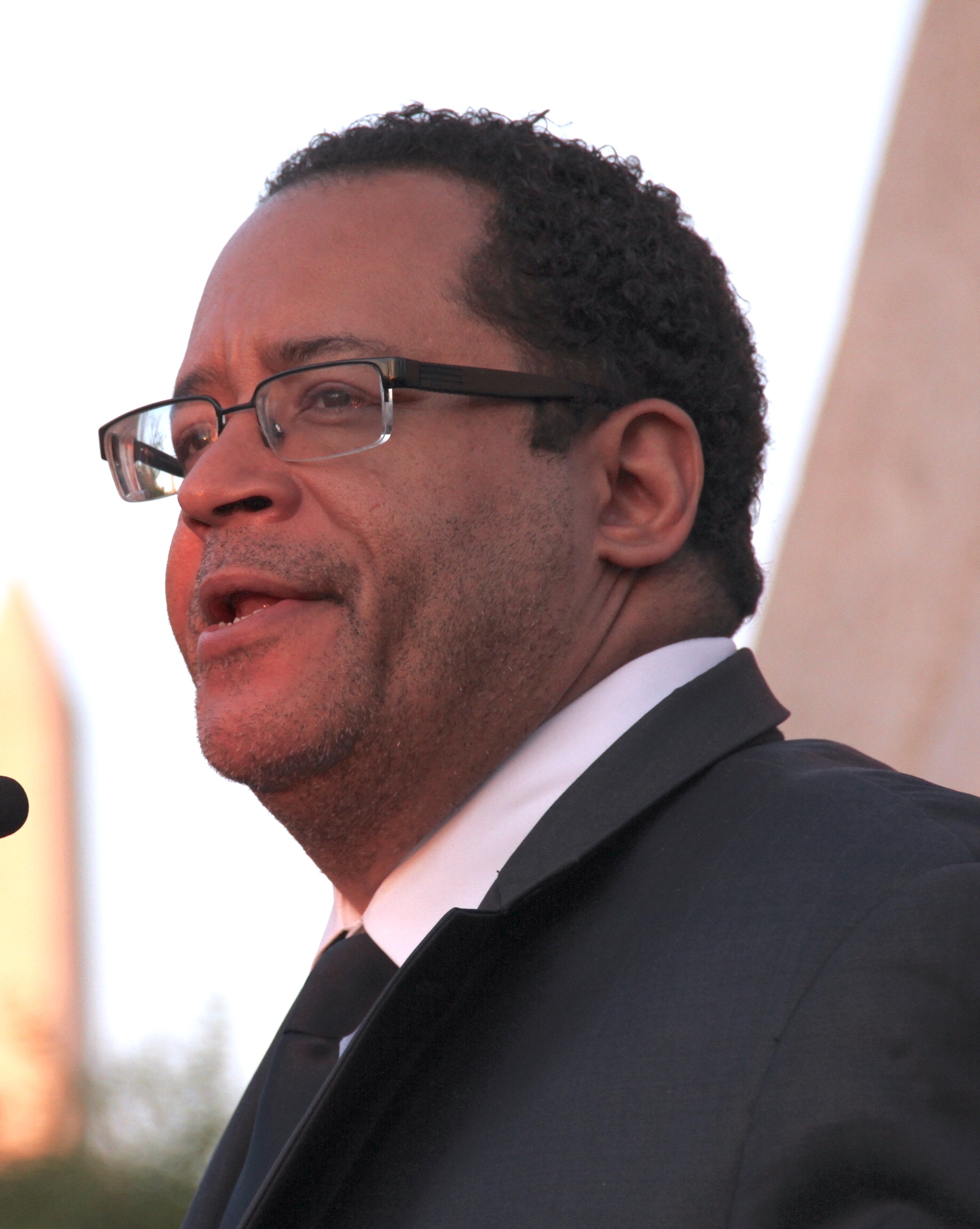
Academic Michael Eric Dyson wrote the book's foreword.

The book opens with a foreword from the black American academic Michael Eric Dyson.

DiAngelo describes white fragility to be a defensive response by a white person when their whiteness is highlighted or mentioned, or their racial worldview is challenged, whether this response is conscious or otherwise. She gives examples including a white man accusing someone of "playing the race card" or a white woman crying to avoid conflict. DiAngelo proposes that white people are used to viewing themselves as "raceless" or the "default" race, and as such are insulated from feelings of racial discomfort. She describes racism as systematic rather than overt and conscious, arguing that racial segregation has shaped the United States. She points to research that has shown that children as young as four years old show a strong and consistent pro-white bias and an especially strong prejudice against black males.

DiAngelo says that people associate racism with extremists such as neo-Nazis or self-identified white supremacists, who they label as "bad people", and conclude that because they are a "good person" that they cannot be racist. She criticizes white liberals, arguing that white people who identify as "progressive" view themselves as "woke" to avoid questioning any issue of racism in themselves. She terms these reactions "aversive racism" and writes that it prevents people from addressing unconscious racist bias, which she believes everyone has. Contrastingly, she uses the term "avowed racists" to refer to those who she believes are intentionally perpetrating racism.

The author writes that "color blindness", the idea that one should not notice or think about a person's race, is unhelpful as it prevents people from understanding how race does matter in the current world. She criticizes individualism, the American Dream and the philosophical concept of objectivity. Instead, she promotes utilitarianism. The book describes the lynching of Emmett Till in 1955, a 14-year-old child who was accused of harassing a white woman. It also uses as an example Jackie Robinson, the first African-American to play in Major League Baseball (MLB) in the modern era (1901- ). DiAngelo says that a stereotype of black men as violent and dangerous is untrue and used to justify continuing racist brutality.

== Reception ==
Nosheen Iqbal wrote in The Guardian that "DiAngelo's book is a radical statement at a time when the debate is so polarised."

=== Praise ===
White Fragility became a New York Times bestseller for more than a year. In September 2019, Slate noted that "White Fragility has yet to leave the New York Times bestseller list since its debut in June 2018, making it the fastest-selling book in the history of Beacon Press." In June 2020, during the George Floyd protests, it reached no. 1 on the New York Times list. The July 26, 2020 edition of the list marked the book's 97th week in the Paperback Nonfiction category, where it was ranked number 1.

The Los Angeles Review of Books review by David Roediger reviewed the book very positively and praised DiAngelo's "keen perception, long experience, and deep commitment" and said the book is "uncommonly honest about the duration and extent of entrenched injustice and provocative on the especially destructive role of progressive whites at critical junctures." He concluded that the book "reads better as evidence of where we are mired than as a how-to guide on where we are on the cusp of going."

The Publishers Weekly review called it "a thoughtful, instructive, and comprehensive book on challenging racism" and "impressive in its scope and complexity". The New Statesman review described it as "a clear-sighted, methodical guide seeking to help readers 'navigate the roiling racial waters of daily life', though stops short of prescribing any concrete solutions." It asserted that DiAngelo's "overarching aim is not for her readers to feel guilty about their white identity. Rather it is to encourage them to understand that there will be no change if they are just 'really nice… smile at people of colour… go to lunch together on occasion'."

For The New Yorker in 2018, staff writer Katy Waldman wrote about White Fragility that "[t]he book is more diagnostic than solutions-oriented, and the guidelines it offers toward the end—listen, don't center yourself, get educated, think about your responses and what role they play—won't shock any nervous systems. The value in White Fragility lies in its methodical, irrefutable exposure of racism in thought and action, and its call for humility and vigilance."

=== Criticism ===
In an August 2019 article for The New Yorker, the columnist Kelefa Sanneh characterized DiAngelo as "perhaps the country's most visible expert in anti-bias training, a practice that is also an industry, and from all appearances a prospering one". He suggested that DiAngelo "reduces all of humanity to two categories: white and other" and that she presents people of color as "sages, speaking truths that white people must cherish, and not challenge." Sanneh was also critical of what he saw as DiAngelo's tendency to be "endlessly deferential—for her, racism is basically whatever any person of color thinks it is". He also observes that there is an enormous "difference in scale between the historical injustices [DiAngelo] invokes and the contemporary slights she addresses".

In a 2020 op-ed for The New York Times, journalist and political correspondent Jamelle Bouie argued that the recent emphasis on exploring white fragility siphoned crucial energy from white people inwardly, towards their own behavior, instead of funneling resources and time into exploring wealth inequality and other harmful consequences of white supremacy.

Also writing in The Guardian, Kenan Malik countered in 2020 that the book is "psychobabble" which counter-productively shifts the focus from structural change to individual bias, thus "leaving the real issues untouched."

Reviewing Sanneh's comments, professor Lauren Michele Jackson "consider[s] DiAngelo's inclusion of seemingly incongruous grievances a strength. Etiquette is never beside the point. As DiAngelo has said, neither White Fragility nor her workshops intend to convert the gleefully racist; she speaks to the well-intended whose banal blusters make racial stress routine." However, Jackson found the lack of cited scholars of color troubling: "I couldn't help but notice the relative dearth of contemporary black studies scholarship cited in White Fragility."

Carlos Lozada, The Washington Post's nonfiction book critic, raised a point about circular reasoning: "any alternative perspective or counterargument is defeated by the concept itself. Either white people admit their inherent and unending racism and vow to work on their white fragility, in which case DiAngelo was correct in her assessment, or they resist such categorizations or question the interpretation of a particular incident, in which case they are only proving her point."

After the George Floyd protests, the book received some negative reviews. Journalist and author Matt Taibbi strongly criticized the book as having a corporate vision of racism, labeling the book "pseudo-intellectual horseshit" that is likely to have pernicious effects for race relations. In his view, the book divisively fetishises race and places it at the centre of people's identities, while denying the significance of individual personalities and moral choices and the universal human experience.

Linguist John McWhorter, writing in The Atlantic, called the book "a racist tract", saying it infantilized and condescended towards black people. He also stated the book was "replete with claims that are either plain wrong or bizarrely disconnected from reality". As examples, he cited DiAngelo's claim that white baseball fans believe that no Black person before Jackie Robinson was in the Major Leagues because none were qualified and her claim that in the American higher-education system no one ever talks about racism. He argued that the book contradicts itself about white racial identity and leaves white people with no way to avoid being racist. He further criticized the book for not explaining why or how its instructions will help to accomplish social change.

Writing in the Boston Review, political science professor Peter Dreier also criticizes DiAngelo's interpretation of the Jackie Robinson story. "Contrary to DiAngelo's retelling," Dreier writes, "Robinson's success did not render 'whites, white privilege, and racist institutions invisible.'" He further writes that "In White Fragility DiAngelo examines racism as a web of deeply-ingrained attitudes rather than as a system of power—what is often called institutional or systemic racism. Perhaps this is because discussing the redistribution of power, wealth, and income might not sit comfortably with DiAngelo's corporate clients."

White Fragility was criticized by Alan Sokal on epistemological grounds in an article in the Journal of Philosophy of Education. In it, he criticizes DiAngelo among other things for employing logical fallacies, such as bulverisms and kafkatraps, and concludes that what DiAngelo presents as "established truths" should instead be presented as "conjectures": "DiAngelo rightly urges white people to be humble when reflecting upon their own racial views; it is unfortunate that she fails to apply the same humility when considering her own theories."

Douglas Murray criticized the main contention of the book: that not only were all white people racist, but that white people who objected to being called racist were simply providing further evidence of their racism. "Meaning that the best thing to do in any given situation is for a person to save time and confess to being a racist."

== See also ==
- White defensiveness
- Stuff White People Like
