= Beacon Press =

American non-profit book publisher

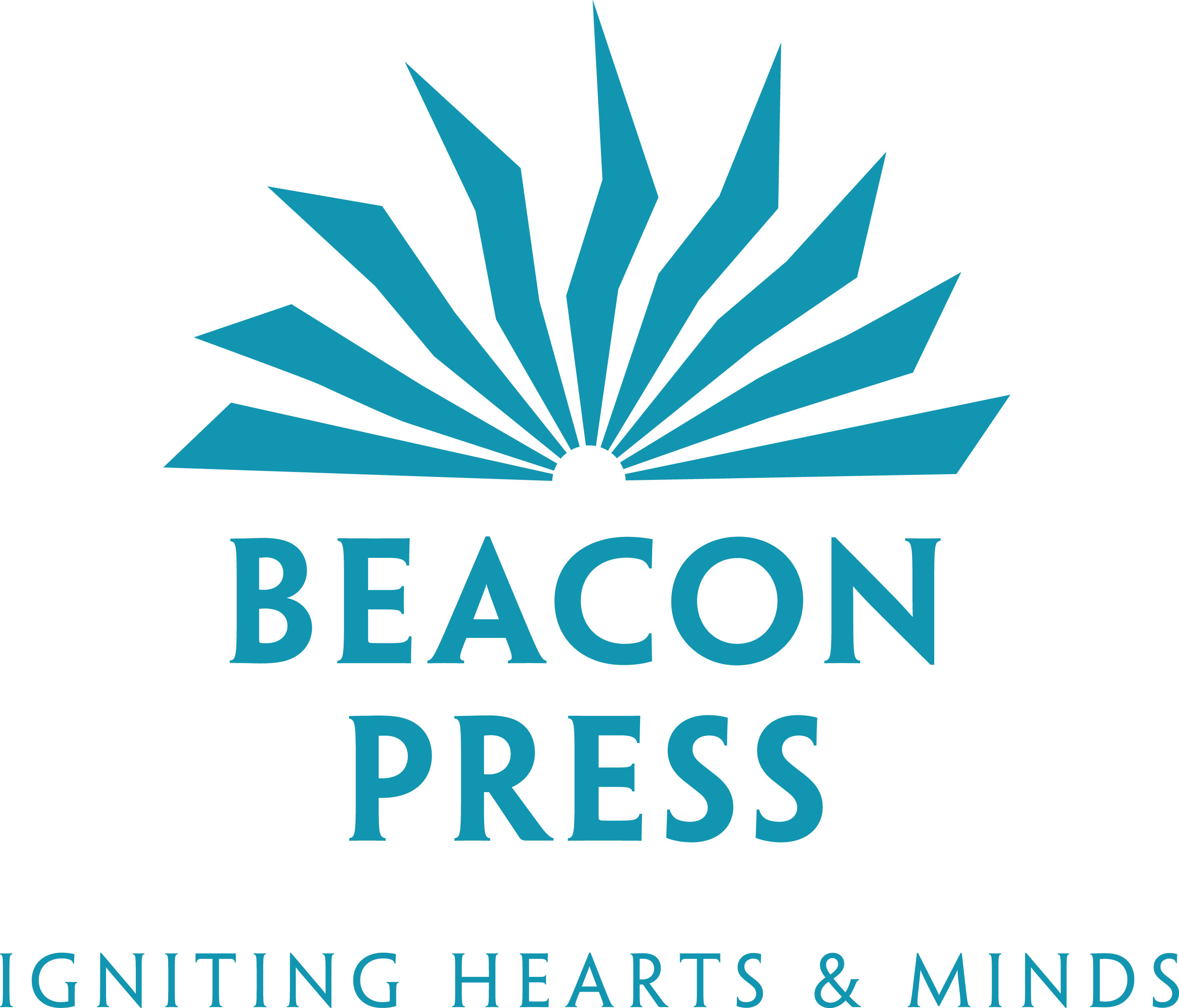
- Parent company: Unitarian Universalist Association
- Founded: 1854
- Country of origin: United States
- Headquarters location: Boston
- Distribution: Penguin Random House Publisher Services (worldwide); Publishers Group UK (UK)
- Key people: Gayatri Patnaik, director
- Official website: www.beacon.org

Beacon Press was founded in 1854 by the American Unitarian Association, it is currently a department of the Unitarian Universalist Association. It is a Boston based mission driven non-profit book publisher known for publishing authors such as James Baldwin, Mary Oliver, Martin Luther King Jr., and Viktor Frankl, as well as The Pentagon Papers.

== History ==
The history of Beacon Press began in 1825, the year the American Unitarian Association (AUA) was formed. This liberal religious movement had the enlightened notion to publish and distribute books and tracts that would spread the word of their beliefs not only about theology, but also about society and justice.

=== The early years: 1854–1900 ===
In the Press of the American Unitarian Association (as Beacon was called then) purchased and published works that were largely religious in nature and "conservative Unitarian" in viewpoint (far more progressive, nonetheless, than many other denominations). The authors were often Unitarian ministers—dead or alive, American or British, mostly Caucasian, and far more male than female. Many of the books were collections of sermons, lectures, and letters, balanced by volumes of devotion, hymns, and morally uplifting tales.

=== New century, new mission: 1900–1945 ===
In the early 1900s Samuel Eliot broadened the mission of the press by publishing books dealing with ethical, sociological, philanthropic, and similar subjects, as well as those of a more strictly religious character.... Although books of marked theology and religious note continued to have a predominant place in Association publication, the wide interest in all subjects relating to social and moral betterment were included and the evergrowing topics of war and peace and arbitration, or national amity and racial brotherhood were represented

=== The modern era: 1945– ===
In 1949, Beacon published American Freedom and Catholic Power, an anti-Catholic tome written by socialist and secular humanist Paul Blanshard, who was the assistant editor for The Nation. Beacon would go on to publish several other books by Blanshard critical of Catholicism over the next few decades.

Under director Gobin Stair (1962–75), new authors included James Baldwin, Kenneth Clark, André Gorz, Herbert Marcuse, Jürgen Habermas, Howard Zinn, Ben Bagdikian, Mary Daly, and Jean Baker Miller. Wendy Strothman became Beacon's director in 1983; she set up the organization's first advisory board, a group of scholars and publishing professionals who advised on book choices and direction. She turned a budget deficit into a surplus. In 1995, her last year at Beacon, Strothman summarized the Press's mission: "We at Beacon publish the books we choose because they share a moral vision and a sense that greater understanding can influence the course of events. They are books we believe in." Strothman was replaced by Helene Atwan in 1995.

In 1971, it published the "Senator Gravel edition" of the Pentagon Papers for the first time in book form, when no other publisher was willing to risk publishing such controversial material. Robert West, then-president of the Unitarian Universalist Association, approved the decision to publish the Pentagon Papers, which West claims resulted in two-and-a-half years of harassment and intimidation by the Nixon administration. In Gravel v. United States, the Supreme Court decided that the Constitution's Speech or Debate Clause protected Gravel and some acts of his aide, but not Beacon Press.

Beacon Press seeks to publish works that "affirm and promote" several principles:

the inherent worth and dignity of every person; justice, equity and compassion in human relations; acceptance of one another; a free and responsible search for truth and meaning; the right of conscience and the use of the democratic process in society; the goal of the world community with peace, liberty, and justice for all; respect for the interdependent web of all existence; and the importance of literature and the arts in democratic life.

Beacon Press is a member of the Association of University Presses.

== Books and authors ==
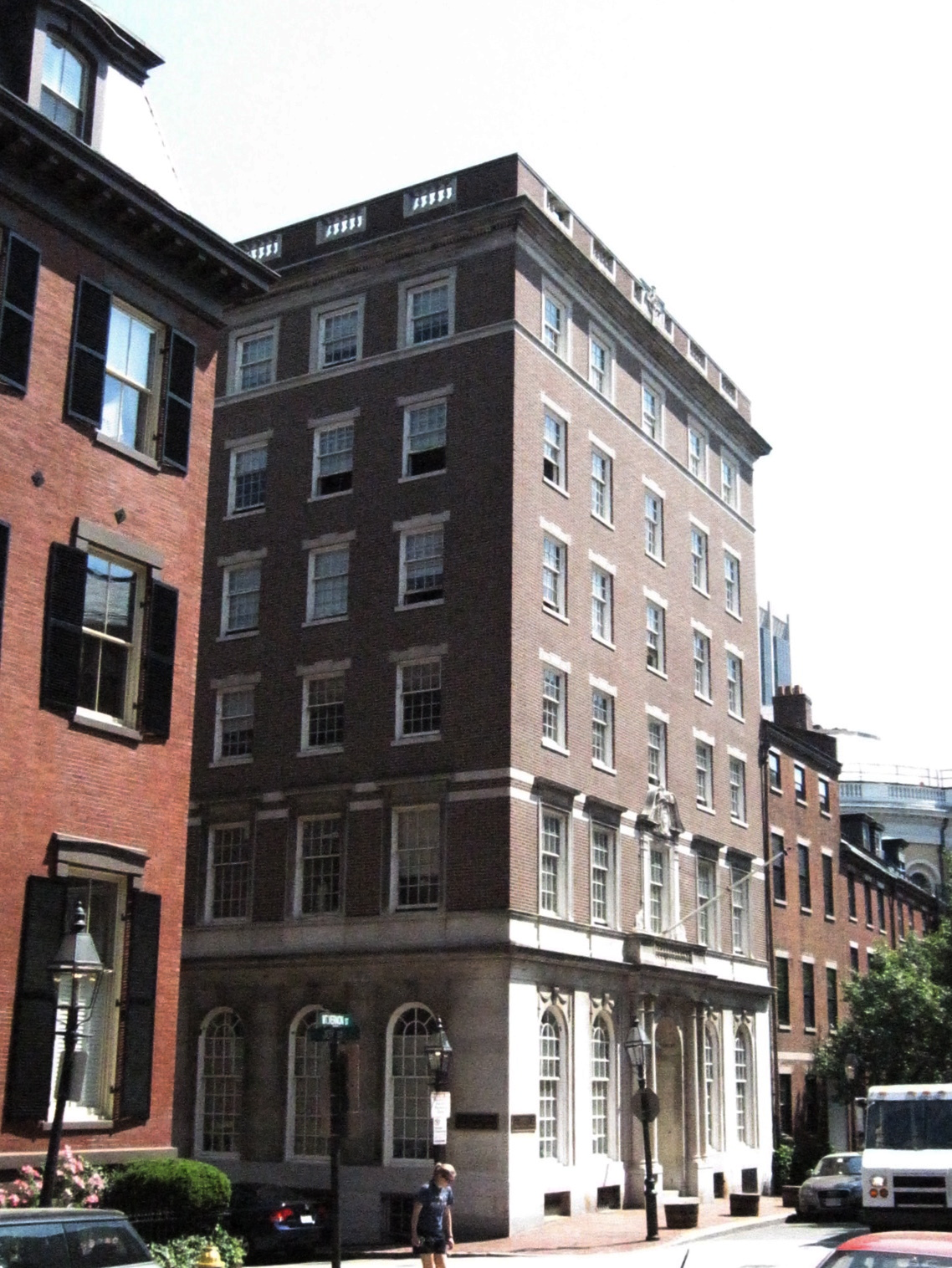
Beacon Press building, Beacon Hill, Boston, 1997-2014

Beacon Press publishes non-fiction, fiction, and poetry titles. Some of Beacon's best-known titles are listed below.

Title(s)	Author(s)	Year(s)
American Freedom and Catholic Power	Paul Blanshard	1948, 1958
SNCC: The New Abolitionists	Howard Zinn	1964
A Critique of Pure Tolerance	Robert Paul Wolff, Barrington Moore Jr, Herbert Marcuse	1965
Where Do We Go from Here: Chaos or Community?	Martin Luther King Jr.	1967, 2010
Albert Schweitzer: An Anthology	Albert Schweitzer	1982
The Transsexual Empire	Janice Raymond	1979
Notes of a Native Son	James Baldwin	1984
Toward a New Psychology of Women	Jean Baker Miller	1987
Gyn/Ecology	Mary Daly	1990
One-Dimensional Man	Herbert Marcuse	1964
Fist, Stick, Knife, Gun	Geoffrey Canada	1995
The Power of Their Ideas	Deborah Meier	1995
Race Matters	Cornel West	2001
New and Selected Poems: Volume One, Thirst	Mary Oliver	2005, 2007
Resurrecting Empire	Rashid Khalidi	2005
Man's Search for Meaning	Viktor Frankl	2006
Without a Map	Meredith Hall	2007
All Souls: A Family Story from Southie	Michael Patrick MacDonald	2007
The Court and the Cross	Frederick Lane	2008
An African American and Latinx History of the United States	Paul Ortiz	2018
White Fragility	Robin DiAngelo	2018
Superior: The Return of Race Science	Angela Saini	2019
Nice Racism	Robin DiAngelo	2021
Chokepoint Capitalism	Rebecca Giblin, Cory Doctorow	2022
Love Never Dies	Emma Cline	2026

== Book series ==
The following is a list of some of the principal series; it is not comprehensive.

- Beacon Paperbacks
- The Beacon Press Schweitzer Series
- Beacon Reference Series
- Beacon Series in Liberal Religion
- Beacon Studies in Freedom and Power
- Beacon Studies in Soviet Tyranny and Power
- Beacon Wit and Wisdom Series
- Black Women Writers Series
- Bluestreak: A Paperback Series of Innovative Literary Writing, Featuring Works by Women of Color
- Celebrating Black Women Writers
- Concord Library
- The New Beacon Series
- A Seventies Press Book
- True American Types
- Why I Am

=== The King Legacy (series) ===
In 2009, Beacon Press announced a new partnership with the Estate of Martin Luther King Jr. for a new book series publishing program, "The King Legacy." As part of the program, Beacon is printing new editions of previously published King titles and compiling Dr. King's writings, sermons, orations, lectures, and prayers into entirely new editions, including new introductions by leading scholars.

== Beacon Broadside ==
Beacon Press launched its blog, Beacon Broadside, in late September 2007.

== Awards ==
In 1992, Beacon won a New England Book Award for publishing. In 1993, Beacon was voted "Trade Publisher of the Year" by the Literary Market Place.

== See also ==
- List of English-language book publishing companies
- List of university presses
- Skinner House Books, another book publisher of the UUA, specializing in books for Unitarian Universalists
