= Nice Racism =

2021 book by Robin DiAngelo

Nice Racism: How Progressive White People Perpetuate Racial Harm
- Front cover
- Author: Robin DiAngelo
- Language: English
- Subject: Race relations in the United States
- Publisher: Beacon Press
- Publication date: June 29, 2021
- Publication place: United States
- Pages: 224
- ISBN: 978-0-8070-7412-1
- Preceded by: White Fragility

Nice Racism: How Progressive White People Perpetuate Racial Harm is a 2021 book by Robin DiAngelo on the subject of race relations in the United States. Following on from White Fragility (2018), DiAngelo criticizes behavior by white progressives as racist and discusses situations from her diversity training workshops and personal life. The book became a New York Times Best Seller, and received mixed critical reception.

== Background ==
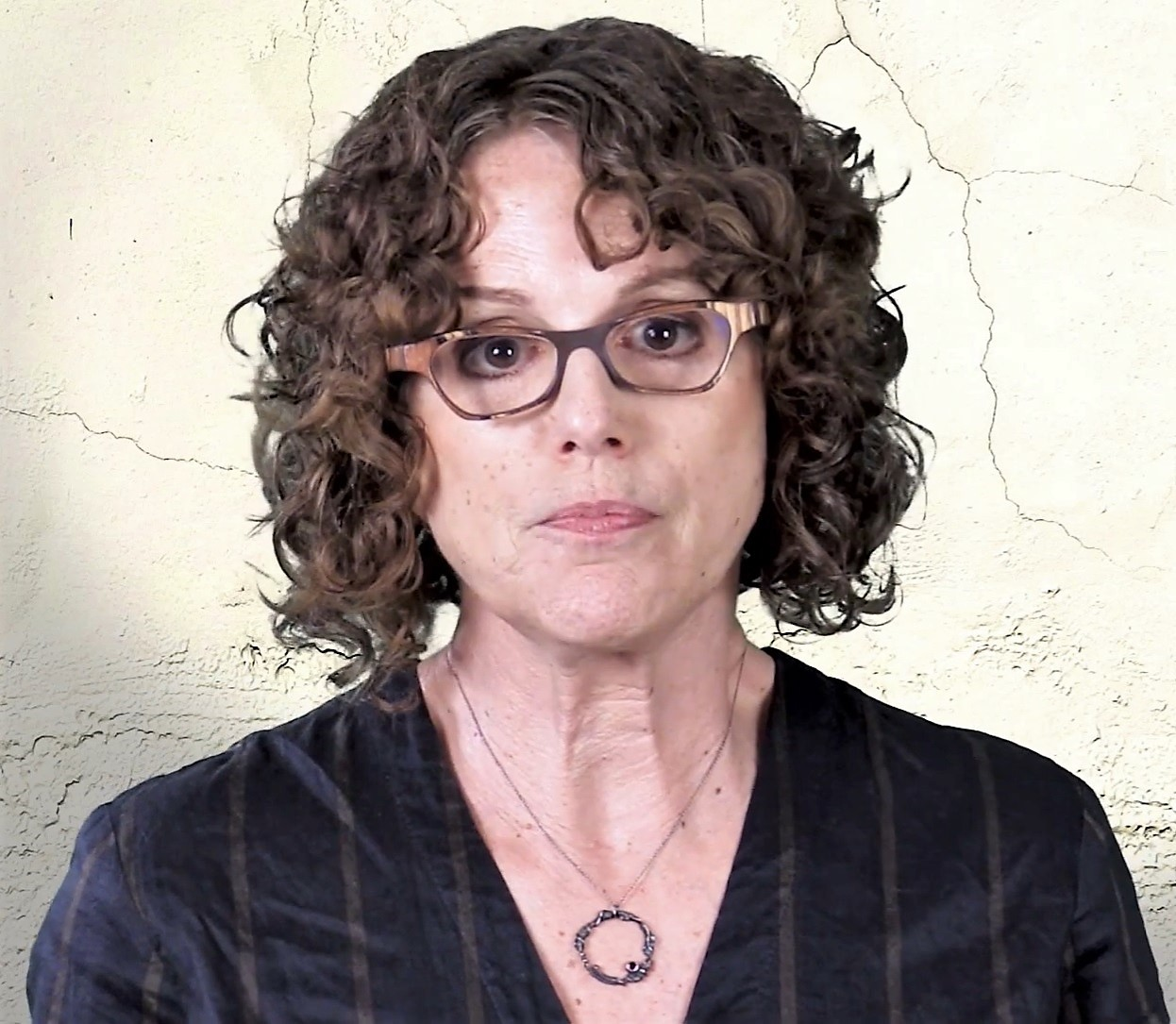
Author Robin DiAngelo in 2020

Author Robin DiAngelo is a white American academic. She worked for 20 years in providing diversity training for businesses. After five years in the job, she began studying for a PhD in multicultural education at the University of Washington. DiAngelo became a tenured professor at Westfield State University, working in the areas of critical discourse analysis and whiteness studies. At the time of Nice Racism's publishing, DiAngelo was an affiliate associate professor of education at the University of Washington.

Nice Racism followed on from DiAngelo's most well-known work: her third book, White Fragility (2018). It takes its name from the term "white fragility", which DiAngelo coined in 2011 to describe defensive behavior by a white person when their conception of racism is questioned. White Fragility was reviewed negatively by right-wing commentators. Among anti-racists, White Fragility received mixed reception, being seen by some as encouraging racial essentialism. In response to critics who argued that material political changes were needed rather than individual attitude changes, DiAngelo said: "I don't see that they can be separated. Institutions are not people, but people make up institutions". She also said that her generalization of white people as a category is in opposition to "the ideology of individualism" and that those who thought she was aiming to cause guilt were "willfully misreading" her books, as "guilt serves no one". Responding to criticism of Nice Racism that DiAngelo labels some actions and their opposites as both problematic, she said "in some ways you are damned if you do and damned if you don't ... we just simply are not going to get this right ... but again, that should never be the reason you don't struggle to get it a little more right".

Nice Racism was published on June 29, 2021, by Beacon Press. Its target audience is white progressives. DiAngelo said that White Fragility "established that racism exists" and that Nice Racism explores the less obvious question of how white progressives are affected by and engage in racism. DiAngelo said that her goal for the impact of her works was to achieve "less harm" done. Though she found analysis of racism more interesting than outlining a solution, DiAngelo said that she was always asked for an answer and that "there's constant pressure when you write a book to 'Make sure that last chapter tells people what to do'". In some of the writing, she aimed to "close all of the escape valves" that she had observed white people using as a way to avoid responsibility, such as by emphasizing the importance of an action's impact, regardless of its intention. One chapter, "Why It's Okay to Generalize About White People", was a topic that DiAngelo was compelled to "take on right away" after not exploring it sufficiently in White Fragility.

== Synopsis ==
The book describes many experiences DiAngelo had while working in diversity training and workshops about race, as well as her personal life, including her experience of poverty in childhood. Following on from White Fragility, DiAngelo replies to criticism of the book. The book contains a study guide for navigation.

DiAngelo presents patterns of white progressives unknowingly engaging in racial harm, such as by being overeager to prove themselves anti-racist to people of color, co-opting indigenous or minority ethnic cultural traditions, or expecting people of color to educate them. The book contains a list of some things that DiAngelo believes cause racial harm.

== Reception ==
The book was thirteenth in The New York Times Best Seller list for Hardcover Nonfiction in the week July 18, 2021. Based on independent bookstore sales in Canada, the book was seventh in the Vancouver Sun's international bestsellers in the New Releases category for sales ending in the week July 3, 2021.

The Times's Clive Davis gave a negative review of the book, describing many of DiAngelo's opinions as "brutally reductive" and "clouded by a puritanical dogma", such as her criticism of white women offering sympathy to crying black women in a group session she attended. He also reviewed the prose as "robotic". However, Davis found "some worthwhile observations" about race and class in the US and sympathized with DiAngelo's childhood poverty. In a negative review for The Observer, Ashish Ghadiali reviewed DiAngelo's writing as "condescending" and filled with "deep internal contradiction", as she "assumes the role of an omniscient narrator", but describes situations in which she engages in behavior that she criticizes elsewhere "without any sense of irony or awareness".

In a mixed review, Publishers Weekly believed that DiAngelo "dismantles unconscious biases with precision" and that the book leads readers "to hold themselves more accountable", but criticized DiAngelo's defensiveness as "more exhausting than inspiring". A writer for Kirkus Reviews recommended the book as a "valuable primer" to the topic, describing it as a "pointed reminder that good intentions aren't enough" to combat racism and praising DiAngelo's comments on white people finding it difficult to be open-minded and listen to descriptions of race-related issues. Jenny Hamilton of Booklist praised that it "carefully delineates manifestations of white progressive racism and breaks down the reasons they are problematic and how to do better", approving of DiAngelo's exploration of her own flawed behavior and recommending the book as a way "for white liberals to understand their role in upholding white supremacy" and "know and do better".
