= Sun Yung Shin =

American poet (born 1974)

- Born: 1974 (age 51–52); Seoul, South Korea

Korean name
- Hangul: 신선영
- RR: Sin Seonyeong
- MR: Sin Sŏnyŏng

Sun Yung Shin (born 1974) is a Korean American poet, writer, consultant, and educator living in Minneapolis, Minnesota.

She is the editor of A Good Time for the Truth: Race in Minnesota (Minnesota Historical Society Press, 2016). Her books of poetry include The Wet Hex (Coffee House Press, 2022), Unbearable Splendor (Coffee House Press, 2016), Rough, and Savage (Coffee House Press, 2012), and Skirt Full of Black (Coffee House Press, 2007). She co-authored the children's book of poems Revolutions are Made of Love (Carolrhoda Books, imprint of Lerner Publishing Group, 2025) and the bilingual (English/Korean) illustrated children's book Cooper's Lesson (Children's Book Press, imprint of Lee & Low Books, 2004). She was an editor with Jane Jeong Trenka and Julia Chinyere Oparah for Outsiders Within: Writing on Transracial Adoption (South End Press, 2006), the first international anthology on the politics of transracial adoption edited by transracial adoptees. Outsiders Within: Writing on Transracial Adoption was released in a Korean-language edition by KoRoot Press in Seoul, South Korea, in 2012.

== Biography ==
Shin was born in Seoul, South Korea, and was adopted when she was 13 months during the second big wave of the adoption of Asian children. She was adopted by a white couple and was raised and grew up in Chicago.

She attended Boston University for one year and then transferred to Macalester College in St. Paul, Minnesota and graduated cum laude with a degree in English. After graduating, she worked for a technology companies whose clients included United Health, The US Navy, and Pillsbury to pay off her college loans and pursue a master's degree. While in the process of obtaining her master's degree in teaching from the University of St. Thomas, she took a course on adolescent literature from playwright John Fenn. He liked a poem she wrote and took it home for his partner Jill Breckenridge to read. She loved it and encouraged Shin to continue writing poetry. Afterwards, she became the poetry editor of the campus literary magazine for Macalester College. From 2001 to 2002, Shin was in SASE: The Write Place mentor program with Minnesota poet Mark Nowak. Through the Loft's program, she was mentored by Wang Ping.

Shin has worked teaching literature, media reform and creative writing at the Perpich Center for Arts Education. She also taught composition and creative writing at the University of Minnesota, Macalester College, Hamline University, University of St. Thomas, The College of St. Catherine, The Loft Literary Center and Intermedia Arts/SASE: The Write Place. She taught English as second language and has been a guest artist in many inner city schools in the Minneapolis-St Paul. She was also involved in the now defunct Asian American Renaissance and as a board member on many other community organizations.

Shin presents her work frequently in the Twin Cities, and her poems have appeared in journals such as Indiana Review, Swerve, Court Green, Mid-American Review, Sonora Review, Capilano Review and Xcp cross-cultural poetics.

== Awards and honors ==
Shin won the Asian American Literary Award in 2008 for her book of poems Skirt Full of Black. Shin's essays and fiction are anthologized in Fiction on a Stick (Milkweed), Riding Shotgun (Borealis), Transforming a Rape Culture (Milkweed), Echoes Upon Echoes: New Korean American Writings (Temple University), The Encyclopedia Project Vol. 1, A-E, Vol. 2, F - K, and The Adoption Encyclopedia (Greenwood Publishing). She also received the Minnesota Book Award in 2017 for her book Unbearable Splendor.

She is a recipient of grants and awards from the (Archibald) Bush Foundation, two time award recipient of Minnesota State Arts Board, Blacklock Nature Sanctuary, and The Loft Literary Center, and recipient of an artist's grant from the McKnight Foundation. She is also a 2022 MacDowell Residency Fellow.

In 2023, she won the Carter G. Woodson Book Award (Elementary Level) for Where We Come From.

== Publications ==
Books		Fiction in Anthologies	
Title	Year	Title	Year
Cooper's Lesson: 쿠퍼의 레슨	2004	"Asian American Writing" and "Cuttlefish"	2006
Outsiders Within: Writing on Transracial Adoption	2006	The Woodcutter: A Retelling	2009
Skirt Full of Black	2007	Korean Cinema	2010
Outsiders Within: Writing on Transracial Adoption [Korean Version]	2012	Isolette	2011
Rough, and Savage	2013	The Other Asterion	2015
A Good Time for the Truth: Race in Minnesota	2016	Valley, Uncanny	2015
Unbearable Splendor	2016	Women: Poetry: Migration	2016
The Wet Hex	2022	Jane, Jamestown, The Starving Time	
Where We Come From	2022		
Revolutions are Made of Love	2025		

=== Poems in journals ===
- A Mortal Fantasy (Axe Factory Review, Issue 12, Print) (Fall, 2000)
- The Wolveish Forage (DUSIE, Online) (July, 2017)
- Immigrant Song (Poetry Foundations, Online) (June, 2017)
- Woven Through with Snakes (The Cultural Society, Online) (June, 2017)

=== Essays / non-fiction in anthologies ===
- "Harness" (Others Will Enter the Gates, New York, Print) (2014)

=== Essays in journals and other media ===
- Afterword for Asian/American Curricular Epistemicide: From Being Excluded to Becoming Model Minority (Sense Publishing, The Netherlands, Print) (2016)

=== Poems in special editions and venues ===
- Empty Ring, Nest Fire (Poem-a-Day, Academy of American Poets) (November 23, 2015)

==== Literary criticism ====
- Human Acts (Star Tribune, by Han Kang) (January 13. 2017)
