= Paul Ortiz =

Paul Ortiz may refer to:

- Paul Ortiz (historian) (born 1964), history professor and author
- Paul Ortiz (musician), multi-instrumentalist
