= Approaches to prejudice reduction =

Prejudice is a preconceived, typically unfavorable opinion towards someone based on their belonging to a particular social group. Prejudice often results in discrimination towards others due to race, class, age, gender, nationality, or other factors.

There is a multitude of research on the factors that lead to the formation of prejudiced attitudes and beliefs. There is also research on the consequences of holding and being the target of prejudiced beliefs. A consensus on how to end prejudice has yet to be established, but there are a number of scientifically examined strategies that have been developed in attempt to solve this social issue.

== Intergroup interaction approaches ==
Intergroup interaction approaches to prejudice reduction refer to strategies in which members of one group are put in situations where they have to interact with members of another group that they may hold prejudiced beliefs about. For example, if people from Group X are prejudiced towards people from Group Y or vice versa, an intergroup approach would require at least one person from Group X to interact with at least one person from Group Y. The expectation is that prejudice will decrease following a specified type of interaction. Intergroup approaches to prejudice reduction have been studied a great deal in laboratory settings, as well as outside of the laboratory, particularly in schools. Many intergroup prejudice reduction approaches are grounded in one of 3 main theoretical perspectives: interdependence, intergroup contact, and social identity.

=== Interdependence approaches ===
Interdependence approaches to prejudice reduction are based on psychologist, Morton Deutsch's, theory of interdependence. According to this theory, when two groups realize that they have a common issue that can only be solved by pooling their resources together, they are more likely to engage in cooperative behaviors. Cooperation then results in friendliness during discussion and positive evaluations of the individuals from the opposite group.

Cooperative learning is an interdependence approach originally developed for the purpose of reducing racial prejudice in schools. It is most frequently examined in school settings, and studies testing this approach often occur across weeks.

This approach is most frequently associated with the “jigsaw method” created by social psychologist, Elliot Aronson. With this method, students are put into diverse teams of 5 or 6 people and assigned to complete a task. Each person is given a unique part of the total material necessary for solving the task. Thus, in order to complete the task, team members have to work together, each sharing their unique information with the others. The jigsaw method has been shown to actually reduce prejudice toward members of the stigmatized group. A stigmatized group is a group that “has an attribute that marks them as different and leads them to be devalued in the eyes of others”. The stigmatized group in the context of the jigsaw method is typically a racial minority group. Getting members of the non-stigmatized group to engage in cooperative behaviors with members of the stigmatized group results in increased liking, increased perspective taking, and increased helping behaviors between the different group members.

Another variation of cooperative learning is the competitive-cooperation method. With this method, the learning environment is set up such that students are assigned to diverse groups of 4-5 people and the diverse groups compete with each other in a weekly learning game tournament. Thus, group members are dependent on one another and cooperation is necessary in order for them to do well and outperform the other groups in the tournament. The same outcomes of liking, perspective taking and helping behavior are expected with this type of cooperative learning strategy.

Overall, cooperative learning strategies have been quite effective in reducing prejudice. However, as cooperative learning is generally studied with children in school settings, it is not clear what its impact is on adults. Also, there is little research on whether or not the reduction of prejudice that students experience as a result of cooperative learning extends to their perceptions of the stigmatized group as a whole or just to those members that are part of their assigned cooperative learning group.

=== Intergroup contact approaches ===
Contact approaches to prejudice reduction are based on prominent social psychologist, Gordon Allport's, contact hypothesis. According to this hypothesis, prejudice is best reduced under optimal conditions of contact between those who hold prejudiced beliefs and those who are the targets of prejudiced beliefs. The optimal conditions include equal status between groups in the context of the given situation, shared goals, authority support, and cooperation as opposed to competition. (This does overlap with the cooperative learning strategy discussed above.) Stuart Cook's “railroad studies” are classic examples of the contact hypothesis put into practice. These railroad studies took place in the American South during the 1960s, an especially challenging time and place with respect to interracial relations. In these studies, racially prejudiced white adults were hired to perform a railroad management task with two coworkers under the guise that they were employed at a real part-time job. Unbeknownst to them, the two coworkers – one White and one Black – were research assistants. After working with the two coworkers for over a month under optimal conditions, the initially prejudiced white participants rated their coworkers highly in attractiveness, likeability, and competence. Moreover, several months later, participants still expressed lower prejudice than prejudiced whites that did not have the intergroup contact experience.

=== Social identity approaches ===
According to social identity theory, people are biased to favor their ingroup – the group that they identify as belonging to – at the expense of the outgroup – the group that they do not identify with. Social identity-based approaches to prejudice reduction attempt to make a particular group-based identity, such as race or gender, less salient to individuals from different groups by emphasizing alternative ways of categorizing people.

One way of making a particular group-based identity less salient is through decategorization. Decategorization involves teaching people from different social groups to focus on a person's unique individual characteristics. This is known as individuation, and helps to draw attention away from group differences and toward individual differences. Decategorization often causes ingroup members to perceive fewer similarities among themselves.

Another way of making a particular group-based identity less salient is through recategorization. Here, individuals with different group-based identities are made aware of the fact that the groups to which they belong are part of an overarching group. The salience of their membership in the overarching group is emphasized over their exclusive group based identities. For example, membership in the group “student” would be emphasized over membership in the group “humanities major” or “sciences major”.

Similar to recategorization, crossed categorization is when individuals from opposing groups are made aware of the fact that they both simultaneously belong to a third separate group, and membership in this third group is emphasized. For example, membership the group “military veteran” would be emphasized over membership in the group “humanities major” or “sciences major ”.

Integrative models acknowledge the coexistence of separate group-based identities within a common group identity. This is in alignment with multicultural ideologies that emphasize appreciation for racial and ethnic diversity while still emphasizing a common national identity.

Because divisive group membership is deemphasized in these categorization strategies, people from opposing groups express less ingroup favoritism. However, they do not necessarily show a reduction of bias against the outgroup. This approach has primarily been studied in laboratory settings and often with arbitrarily assigned group categories. It is not entirely clear how these results translate when considering existing social groups in real-world settings.

=== Disclosure approaches ===
Disclosure approaches rely on self-disclosure of personal information. Here, two individuals from different social groups would each reveal a piece of personal information about themselves. The act of disclosure signals vulnerability. This increases trust and liking, and that then results in a decrease of prejudiced beliefs. It is not clear if the decrease in prejudice extends beyond the disclosing individual to the social group to which that person belongs.

== Individual approaches ==
Individual approaches to prejudice reduction are not dependent on intergroup interaction. These approaches only require that an individual be exposed to some relevant information and/or engage in an activity intended to reduce prejudice. There are two main types of individual approaches to prejudice reduction: affective strategies that target what and how you feel, and cognitive strategies that target what and how you think. A lot of the evidence on the effectiveness of affective and cognitive strategies is based on laboratory findings. As most of these studies consist of one-time sessions, it is unclear how long the positive effects of the strategies last. Also, there is not much knowledge about the extent to which these strategies are effective in situations outside of the laboratory.

=== Affective approaches ===
Perspective taking
Taking the perspective of an individual from a stigmatized group has been shown to be effective in reducing prejudice because it evokes feelings of similarity and affinity toward the other person. Evidence from laboratory studies suggests that perspective taking specifically leads to a decrease in the use of stereotypes when categorizing or evaluating a member of a stigmatized group.

Empathy
Encouraging individuals to be empathetic towards stigmatized groups is another feeling-based strategy. Being instructed to be empathetic after reading about or watching videos of discrimination, against a stigmatized group, such as African Americans, results in decreased expressions of prejudice, and a stronger willingness to engage in contact with members of the stigmatized group.

=== Cognitive approaches ===
Thought awareness and suppression
Increasing a person's awareness of his or her prejudiced thoughts and instructing that person to actively suppress those thoughts is a form of prejudice reduction that has been frequently studied in laboratory settings. However, suppression does not always reduce prejudice and sometimes has the opposite effect of increasing it.

Attitude reconditioning
There are several strategies that attempt to recondition or retrain implicit prejudiced attitudes – attitudes that exist outside of a person's conscious awareness. One way of reconditioning implicit attitudes is through classical conditioning, whereby you pair a representation of a stigmatized group with positive images or positive words. While this is helpful in reducing implicit prejudice, it is not necessarily successful at changing conscious attitudes. Another method of reconditioning is known as Situational Attribution Training. This training, based on the ultimate attribution error, reduces implicit prejudice by getting people to focus on situational explanations for negative behaviors displayed by members of stigmatized groups. Again, it is unclear if this leads to a decrease in conscious prejudiced attitudes.

Thought process reconditioning
Some research suggests that teaching people how to engage in more complex thinking elicits less biased evaluations of outgroup members. For example, instructing people on how to apply statistical reasoning to everyday judgments leads people to make more accurate assessments of outgroup members.

Experts and norms
When people are told that experts believe personality traits are changeable and learned, they decrease in their stereotyping of stigmatized groups. Also, stereotyping decreases when people are told that stereotyping of a particular stigmatized group is not the norm for their peers.

Accountability and value consistency
Some prejudice reduction strategies rely on creating a sense of internal conflict. One such strategy involves holding people accountable for their prejudice. Prejudice has been shown to decrease when people are asked to provide concrete reasons for prejudiced beliefs. The process of generating these reasons gets people to consider the irrational nature of their prejudiced beliefs. Another strategy is to get people to view prejudice as being inconsistent with their behaviors or valued attitudes. This creates cognitive dissonance, and people attempt to resolve this tension by reducing expressions of prejudice. For example, after agreeing to write a public statement advocating a policy that is beneficial to racial minorities but costly to whites, whites report more personal support for this policy than before being asked to write the public statement.

Self-affirmation
People are also less likely to endorse prejudiced beliefs when their own self-worth is affirmed. After being made to feel good about themselves, people are more likely to positively rate job candidates from stigmatized groups and less likely to negatively stereotype people from stigmatized groups.

== Integrated approaches ==
Integrated approaches to prejudice reduction include both intergroup and individual components, such as vicarious intergroup contact, perspective taking, and empathy. Many of these integrated approaches involve some form of entertainment. After cooperative learning, entertainment-based interventions are the second most popular prejudice reduction strategy tested in non-laboratory settings. Reading interventions are particularly popular.

Reading interventions typically take place in schools and last an average of 5 weeks. They attempt to influence prejudiced beliefs through the use of engaging stories. Often these stories highlight positive interactions between children who are similar to those receiving the intervention and children who differ from them based on their membership in a stigmatized group. Furthermore, when an emphasis is placed on individual characteristics as opposed to group membership, an experience of vicarious intergroup friendship occurs, and this leads to more positive attitudes toward children from stigmatized groups. There is little knowledge, however, of how such interventions influence children's behavior in actual intergroup interactions.

== Prejudice reduction strategies not often studied ==
Despite the fact that billions of dollars are spent on diversity training a year, workplace diversity training is not necessarily informed by prejudice reduction research, and its effectiveness in reducing prejudice has rarely been examined.

== See also ==
- Anti-bias curriculum
- Cognitive bias mitigation
- Cognitive vulnerability
