= James A. Banks =

American educator

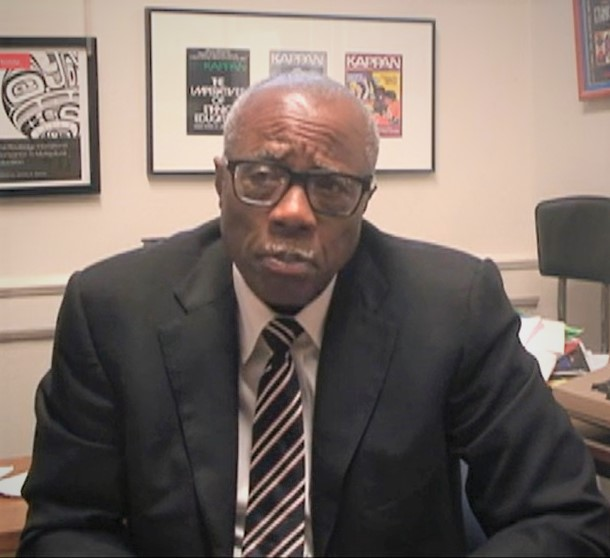
- Born: 1941 (age 84–85); Arkansas, U.S.
- Occupation: Educator
- Title: Kerry and Linda Killinger Endowed Chair in Diversity Studies Emeritus
- Children: 2; including Angela M. Banks, Patricia A. Banks

Academic background
- Education: Chicago Teachers College (B.A.); Michigan State University (M.A., Ph.D.)

Academic work
- Doctoral students: Nicole M. Joseph, Robin DiAngelo

James Albert Banks (born 1941) is an American educator and the Kerry and Linda Killinger Endowed Chair in Diversity Studies Emeritus and founding director of the University of Washington's Center for Multicultural Education, which is now the Banks Center for Educational Justice. He focuses on the discipline of multicultural education.

== Biography ==
Banks grew up on a farm in Arkansas and attended elementary and high school in Lee County, Arkansas.

He received his associate degree with high scholastic honors from Wilson Junior College in Chicago (which is now Kennedy–King College) in 1963. A year later, he received a bachelor's degree in elementary education and social science with honors from Chicago Teachers College, which is now Chicago State University. He received his master's and Ph.D. degrees in these fields from Michigan State University between 1966 and 1969. He was a faculty member in the College of Education at the University of Washington from 1969 to 2019. He was the Russell F. Stark University Professor at the University of Washington from 2001 to 2006.

Banks is known for his work in social studies education, multicultural education, and global citizenship education. His work has won numerous scholarly awards including a Spencer Fellowship from the National Academy of Education, the Teaching English to Speakers of Other Languages, Inc. (TESOL) 1998 Presidents' Award, the National Council for the Social Studies 2001 Distinguished Career Research in Social Studies Award, and the inaugural American Educational Research Association (AERA) Social Justice in Education Award for a career of research that advances social justice through education research in 2004. He, with Cherry A. McGee Banks, received the 2018 Lifetime Achievement Award from the National Association for Multicultural Education.

In 1986, Banks was named a Distinguished Scholar/Researcher on Minority Education by the American Educational Research Association Committee on the Role and Status of Minorities in Educational R & D. He received that Committee's Distinguished Career Award in 1996. In 1994, he was the recipient of the American Educational Research Association Research Review Award. Banks delivered the 29th Annual Faculty Lecture at the University of Washington in 2005, the highest honor given to a professor at that University. He also received in 2005 a Distinguished Alumni Award from Michigan State University. Banks was a Spencer Fellow at the Center for Advanced Study in the Behavioral Sciences at Stanford University during the 2005–2006 academic year. In 2007, he was the Tisch Distinguished Visiting professor at Teachers College, Columbia University.

Banks is a past president of the National Council for the Social Studies (NCSS) and the American Educational Research Association (AERA). He is a Fellow of the American Educational Research Association and an elected member of the National Academy of Education and the American Academy of Arts and Sciences.

Banks holds honorary doctorates from the Bank Street College of Education, the University of Alaska, Fairbanks, the University of Wisconsin, Parkside, DePaul University, Lewis and Clark College, and Grinnell College.

== Publications ==
Banks has written widely in the fields of multicultural education, citizenship education, and social studies education. His works include:

=== Books authored ===
- Diversity, Transformative Knowledge, and Civic Education: Selected Essays, 2020
- An Introduction to Multicultural Education (6th edition), 2019
- Cultural Diversity and Education: Foundations, Curriculum, and Teaching (6th edition), 2016
- Teaching Strategies for Ethnic Studies (8th edition), 2009
- Educating Citizens in a Multicultural Society (2nd edition), 2007
- Race, Culture, and Education: The Selected Works of James A. Banks, 2006

=== Books edited ===
- Multicultural Education: Issues and Perspectives (10th edition), co-editor with Cherry A. McGee Banks, 2020
- Citizenship Education and Global Migration: Implications for Theory, Research and Teaching, 2017
- Global Migration, Diversity, and Civic Education: Improving Policy and Practice, co-editor with Marcelo Suarez-Orozco and Miriam Ben-Perez, 2016
- Encyclopedia of Diversity in Education (4 Volumes), 2012
- The Routledge International Companion to Multicultural Education, 2009
- Diversity and Citizenship Education: Global Perspectives, 2004
- Handbook of Research on Multicultural Education (2nd edition), co-editor with Cherry A. McGee Banks, 2004

Books by Banks have been translated into Greek, Japanese, Chinese, Korean, Turkish, and Arabic.
