= White defensiveness =

Political concept

White defensiveness, white denial, white diversion, and white fragility are terms used in some academic and social discussions to describe certain reactions by white individuals during conversations about societal discrimination and concepts such as structural racism and white privilege. It has been applied to analyze responses to discussions of the Atlantic slave trade, European colonization, and scholarly work examining the long-term effects of these historical systems on contemporary societies. Researchers have proposed several categories of such responses, including what they label as denial, diversion, and fragility, with the latter concept gaining wider attention through the work of scholar Robin DiAngelo.

Within these theoretical frameworks, some white individuals are described as exhibiting discomfort or resistance when questioned about racial dynamics or potential instances of racism. These reactions are interpreted by proponents of the theory as coping or self-protective mechanisms, sometimes linked to emotional responses such as distress or the perceived inheritance of historical experiences across generations.

== Definition ==
White defensiveness is a term used in some academic literature to describe certain responses that may occur when white individuals are confronted with discussions about race and racism. Scholars have proposed various categories within this concept, including white denial, white diversion, and white fragility. These frameworks are applied in different contexts to explain reactions that some researchers associate with such discussions. For instance, political scientists Angie Maxwell and Todd Shields have suggested that examining the concept of white privilege can prompt what they describe as defensive responses among some white individuals.

Some academics such as Robin DiAngelo, Julia Chinyere Oparah, George Yancy and Leah Gaskin Fitchue have outlined and analyzed what they characterize as forms of white defensive responses in their works.

=== Subtypes ===
==== White denial ====
White denial is a term used by some scholars to describe responses in which certain individuals or groups dispute or minimize the existence or significance of racial inequality. Examples cited in the literature include claims that racism is no longer a meaningful social factor. Historically, the concept has also been applied by some commentators to interpretations of slavery in the United States that portray it as less harmful or as having had positive effects, such as the argument that American slavery was a benign system or even had a civilizing effect on African Americans.. In this context, theologian Leah Gaskin Fitchue wrote in 2015:

By its very nature, denial is a defense mechanism, a distortion of reality, a delusional projection to reshape reality in a way one desires to see it. James Perkinson's study, White Theology, counters white denial in calling for a "white theology of responsibility (agreeing with Cone) that a serious engagement with history and culture must be at the heart of any American projection of integrity"...

Some researchers link denial to implicit or unconscious bias. Others suggest it may be influenced by feelings of guilt or discomfort, proposing that acknowledging discrimination or racism against another group can be perceived as challenging to the identity of members of socially dominant or majority groups.

George Yancy has discussed what he describes as experiences of white denial in academic settings and in reactions to his work, including his 2015 article Dear White America. Based on her 1998 research, professor Julia Chinyere Oparah argued that anti-racism efforts may advance when white feminists respond to critiques from black women with less defensiveness, and when they recognize ways in which white feminists, as individuals, may silence, overlook, or marginalize Black women.

Robin DiAngelo has written that social pressures on people of color to accommodate what she terms “white fragility” can also reinforce other defensive responses, including what she describes as white denial.

==== White diversion ====
White diversion is a term introduced by academic Max Harris to describe situations in which discussions of race-based discrimination are redirected toward other social issues. According to Harris, this redirection can shift attention away from specific claims of racial discrimination and, in some cases, toward broader or unrelated societal concerns. Harris, a fellow at the University of Oxford, argues that conversations about racism or colonisation may lose focus when such redirection occurs.

Max Harris is the author of The New Zealand Project. Harris argues that discussions of “whiteness” are often linked to historical and social power structures. He outlines four categories of what he describes as defensive responses: denial, diversion, detriment-centring, and calls to move on. Harris developed these concepts based on his observations of social tensions involving Māori communities in New Zealand from the 1990s onward. He compares this framework to debates surrounding the idea of “reverse racism”, noting that Māori individuals are sometimes portrayed negatively when issues of racism are discussed.

==== White fragility ====
Robin DiAngelo has proposed that common understandings of racism—as intentional or overt hostility—contribute to defensive reactions when racism is discussed. DiAngelo introduced the term “white fragility” in the early 2010s and later expanded on it in her 2018 book White Fragility. She defines the concept as a set of emotional and behavioral responses that can arise when individuals experience what she calls “racial stress”.

According to DiAngelo, these responses may include emotions such as anger, fear, or guilt, as well as behaviors such as argumentation, withdrawal, or avoidance. She argues that these reactions function to restore a sense of personal or social stability. Her work has generated both support and criticism in public discourse and academic commentary.

Critics have argued that the concept is circular. Reviewing White Fragility for The Washington Post, Carlos Lozada accepted that the defensiveness DiAngelo describes exists, but wrote that the book relies on circular logic, because a white reader who rejects its claims is taken to be demonstrating them; he also wrote that the book presents people of color as almost entirely powerless. Linguist John McWhorter, writing in The Atlantic, called the book condescending toward Black people, whom he said it treats as delicate, and argued that it directs white readers toward self-examination rather than toward solutions.

Journalist Peter Baker has suggested that behaviors associated with “white fragility” may include silence, denial, accusations of reverse racism, or emotional reactions such as anger or frustration in interpersonal situations. He distinguishes these responses from terms such as “white backlash” or “white rage”, which are used to describe broader collective or, in some cases, violent reactions to social changes affecting racial or ethnic groups.

Philosophers Nabina Liebow and Trip Glazer have further examined the emotional dimensions of white fragility. In a 2019 article published in Inquiry, they introduce the term “emotional white fragility” to refer to emotional responses to racial stress that interfere with constructive dialogue about race. They argue that such reactions often redirect attention toward the emotional state of the white individual rather than the racial concern being raised, situating these responses within broader research on emotion regulation. According to Liebow and Glazer, this dynamic can shift the burden of emotional regulation onto racialized individuals, who may feel compelled to comfort or reassure the person experiencing distress.

Writing in The New Yorker, Katy Waldman similarly described DiAngelo’s framework as identifying recurring emotional reactions that function to “reinstate white equilibrium” when racial stress is introduced. Waldman notes that DiAngelo attributes these responses to socialization within predominantly white environments that can limit the development of what she terms “racial stamina.” Waldman suggests that this pattern can make conversations about racism difficult to maintain, as emotional discomfort may prompt withdrawal or defensiveness.

== History ==
=== European colonialism and slavery ===
Max Harris has discussed a pattern observed in New Zealand politics in which debates about the colonial period sometimes shift focus to pre-European Māori society. He describes this as a form of rhetorical diversion, in which responsibility for historical outcomes associated with colonization is reframed by emphasizing earlier conflicts or practices among Māori communities.

In 1800, a failed rebellion planned by the enslaved man Gabriel Prosser was followed by a decline in public support for some anti-slavery organizations in the Upper South, alongside changes in political and social attitudes among white populations. After slavery was abolished in the United States following the American Civil War, African American communities have historically expressed concern that defensive reactions in discussions of race and history can reduce attention to accountability and policy responses to racial inequality.

=== Study of phenomenon ===
A number of academic studies have examined how defensive responses related to racial identity, including the concept of whiteness, appear in different social contexts such as education. Research by Cynthia Levine-Rasky in 2011 analyzed how implicit defensive attitudes were present among some teacher-training students at a Canadian university, particularly those with more traditional educational perspectives.

== Types of expression ==
=== Reverse racism ===
Cameron McCarthy has described a perspective in which some individuals emphasize a relativistic interpretation of history, arguing that white populations have also experienced forms of historical oppression and racism. In the late 1990s, Professor Paul Orlowski documented debates in working-class communities in British Columbia, Canada, where research into structural racism was sometimes met with claims that such inquiries were biased or characterized as “anti-white”.

=== Terminologist barriers ===
Some commentators argue that the use of specialized terminology associated with critical theory, such as “white privilege” or “white fragility,” can hinder broader discussion of social and institutional inequalities. In 2019, as reported by Professor Lauren Michele Jackson, writer Claudia Rankine stated that she discontinued attempts to record conversations with white men, expressing the view that reliance on precise but contested terminology could limit productive dialogue rather than facilitate it.

=== Explicit, or conscious bias ===
Explicit bias refers to attitudes or behaviors in which individuals are aware of their intentions and understand the potential consequences of their actions. This may include overt unambiguous racism or ethnic discrimination (such as using slurs), deliberate exclusion, verbal or physical harassment, or the use of derogatory or exclusionary language, all of which are consciously recognized by the individual engaging in them.

=== Implicit, or unconscious bias ===
Implicit bias describes attitudes or associations that operate outside an individual’s conscious awareness and may differ from their stated beliefs or values. Although not always recognized by the person affected, such biases can influence perception, decision-making, and judgment, particularly in situations involving time pressure or stress.

== See also ==
- Cultural identity
- Confederate flag movement
- Good old days
- Grievance politics
- Nostalgia for apartheid
- Postcolonial amnesia
- Racial-ethnic socialization
- Racism in the United States
- Resistance (psychoanalysis)
- Social identity
- White backlash
- White identity
- White identity politics
- White Racial Identity Development
- Whiteness theory
- White supremacy
