= Where Do We Go from Here: Chaos or Community? =

1967 book by Martin Luther King Jr.

- Cover of the first edition
- Author: Martin Luther King Jr.
- Cover artist: Bob Kosturko
- Language: English
- Subject: Civil rights, economic justice
- Genre: Non-fiction
- Publisher: Harper & Row (1967); Beacon Press (2010)
- Publication date: 1967, 2010
- Publication place: New York City, New York, United States
- Media type: Print
- Pages: 209 (1967); 223 (2010)
- ISBN: 978-0-8070-0067-0
- OCLC: 423183

Where Do We Go from Here: Chaos or Community? is a 1967 book by American minister, Nobel Peace Prize laureate, and social justice campaigner Martin Luther King Jr. Advocating for human rights and a sense of hope, it was King's fourth and last book before his 1968 assassination.

== Writing and print history ==
King spent a long period in isolation, living in a rented residence in Jamaica with no telephone, composing the book.

It later lapsed out of print until Beacon Press published an expanded edition in 2010, which featured a new introduction passage by King's long-time friend Vincent Gordon Harding and a foreword by King's wife, Coretta Scott King. The revamped version was highlighted as a 2011 University Press Book for Public and Secondary School Libraries and recommended for use in teaching.

== Contents ==
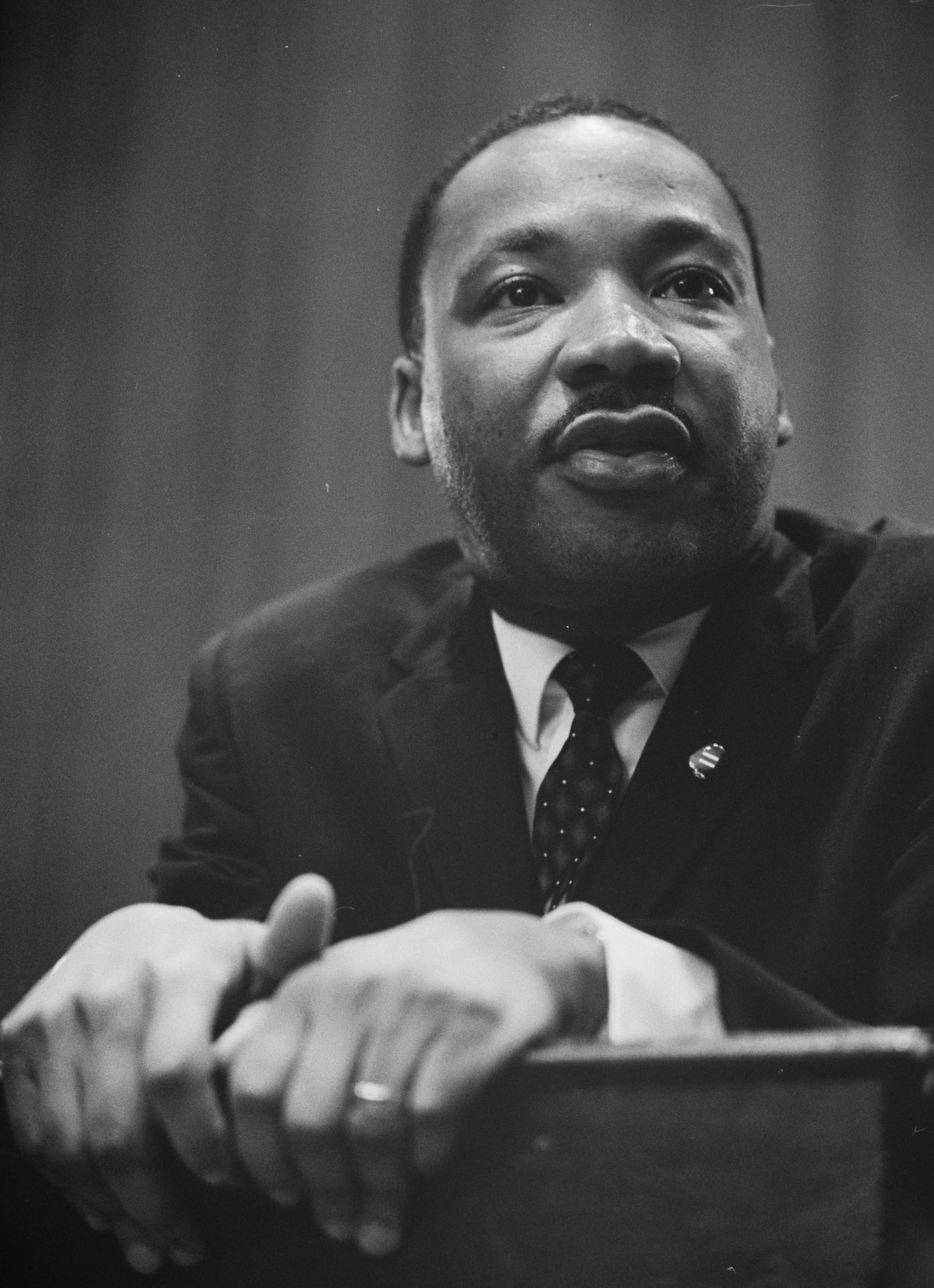
King gives a speech in 1964.

Hope is one of the central themes of the book. King reflects on the Civil Rights Movement and discusses the question of what African-Americans should do with their new freedoms found in laws such as the Voting Rights Act of 1965. He concludes that all Americans must unite in order to fight poverty and create equality of opportunity. King emphasizes that he is neither a Marxist nor a doctrinaire socialist; he instead advocates for a united social movement that would act within both the Republican and Democratic parties.

Establishing a clear contrast between his own views and that of the Black Power movement, King argues that abandoning the fight for nonviolent social change and replacing it with personal militarism tinged with black separatism is both immoral and self-defeating. He also criticizes moderate American whites for having inaccurate, unrealistic views of the ongoing plight of African-Americans, even after legal reforms undertaken under U.S. President Lyndon B. Johnson, and he asserts that radical change is still not only just but necessary. The then ongoing Vietnam War represents, in King's eyes, an immense waste of resources as well as a distraction from pressing domestic issues, the cost in lost lives making it all even worse.

In economic terms specifically, the author cites economic thinker Henry George's Progress and Poverty while writing in support of broadly Georgist ideas, with King quoting George's text that "the work which extends knowledge and increases power and enriches literature ... is not the work of slaves, driven to their task either by the lash of a master or by animal necessities." King concludes that, rather than having a mere welfare state or a general class struggle, U.S. government measures should act more directly to benefit individuals by some kind of guaranteed income:

I am now convinced that the simplest approach will prove to be the most effective—the solution to poverty is to abolish it directly by a now widely discussed measure: the guaranteed income.

— From the chapter titled "Where We Are Going"

== Reception and lasting legacy ==
The philosopher Cornel West remarked:

Martin Luther King, Jr. was one of the greatest organic intellectuals in American history. His unique ability to connect the life of the mind to the struggle for freedom is legendary, and in this book—his last grand expression of his vision—he put forward his most prophetic challenge to powers that be and his most progressive program for the wretched of the earth.

King's argument for a basic income system to improve the U.S. economy and statements against wealth inequality have been cited by a wide variety of later publications. Examples include academic and economist Guy Standing's 2014 book A Precariat Charter: From Denizens to Citizens and professor P.L. Thomas' 2012 book Ignoring Poverty in the U.S.: The Corporate Takeover of Public Education. The revamped 2010 version of King's work was highlighted in a 2011 University Press Book for Public and Secondary School Libraries, and was recommended for use in teaching.

== See also ==
- 1967 in literature
- Guaranteed minimum income
- Martin Luther King Jr.#Legacy
- Bibliography of Martin Luther King Jr.
