= An African American and Latinx History of the United States =

2018 book by Paul Ortiz

- Author: Paul Ortiz
- Language: English
- Series: ReVisioning American History
- Subject: United States History
- Publisher: Beacon Press
- Publication date: 30 Jan 2018
- Publication place: United States
- Pages: 276
- Awards: 2018 PEN Oakland/Josephine Miles Literary Award
- ISBN: 978-080700593-4
- OCLC: 1002664667

An African American and Latinx History of the United States is a book by Paul Ortiz published in 2018 by Beacon Press in its ReVisioning American History series. Ortiz writes in the introduction:

This book draws from the voices and experiences of people from the African and Latinx Diasporas in the Americas to offer a new interpretation of United States history from the American Revolution to the present.

Among the topics examined in the eight chapters of the book are the Haitian Revolution, the Mexican War of Independence, and racial capitalism. With the title of the book's Epilogue Ortiz calls for "a new origin narrative of American history." For this book the author was awarded the 2018 PEN Oakland/Josephine Miles Literary Award.

== Reviews ==
In a review by Antoinette Rochester and Tina L. Heafner in Curriculum and Teaching Dialogue, published by Information Age Publishing, the book was described as "a compelling, in-depth analysis that investigates and expounds on portions of U.S. history that are either briefly touched upon or disregarded." The reviewers found that the book "successfully bridges the gap between the African American and Latinx experience within the United States while also revealing the importance of incorporating the Mexican American and Latin American movements alongside the U.S. Civil Rights movement without dismissing one for the other."

Sandra I. Enríquez reviewing the book in Journal of American Ethnic History, published by University of Illinois Press on behalf of the Immigration & Ethnic History Society, wrote, "Rather than writing a traditional, patriotic, and triumphant history of the United States, Ortiz creates a dialogue between the histories of blacks and Latinxs, as well as their diasporas, and rightly places these experiences at the core of the country’s past. The author dismantles assumptions of American exceptionalism and isolationism by demonstrating connections and intersections of freedom struggles across the Global South and the United States."

Michael C. Miller reviewing the book in the Library Journal wrote, "By combing through hundreds of publications created by Native, African, and Latin Americans as well oral histories, Ortiz is able to paint a picture of this country’s history that differs greatly from the traditional narrative. He presents the past not as an 'exceptional' story of democracy but part of the larger Global South (Latin America, Caribbean, and Africa) fight against imperialism." The reviewer concluded: "A must-read for those who want a deeper perspective than is offered in the traditional history textbook."

In The American Historical Review Perla M. Guerrero wrote, "Ortiz offers a multifaceted narrative of the struggles people have faced and the freedoms they have achieved through blood, sweat, and organizing. He anchors his analysis in the black radical tradition, racial capitalism, and settler colonialism."

A review in Publishers Weekly stated, "While each chapter is insightful, lucidly written, and extensively researched, the book reads more like a series of articles than a cohesive monograph. Ortiz’s work has much to offer, but does not fulfill the promise of its title," while Kirkus Reviews described the book as "A sleek, vital history that effectively shows how, 'from the outset, inequality was enforced with the whip, the gun, and the United States Constitution.'"
