= Angela M. Banks =

American lawyer and legal academic

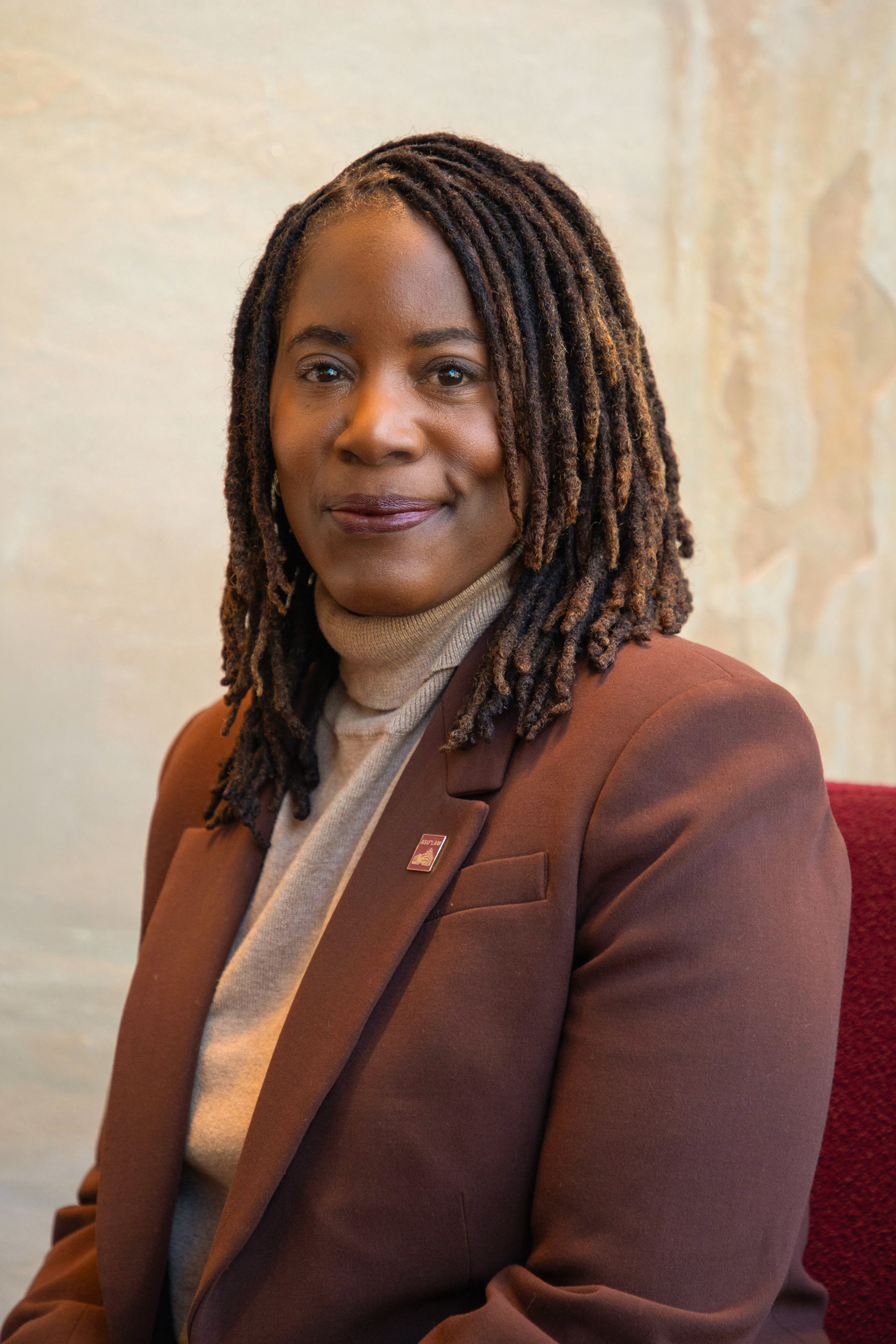
- Children: 2
- Parent: James A. Banks (father)

Academic background
- Education: Spelman College; University of Oxford; Harvard Law School
- Website: angelamariebanks.com

Angela M. Banks is an American lawyer and legal academic specialized in immigration and citizenship. She is the interim Dean and Charles J. Merriam distinguished professor of law at the Sandra Day O'Connor College of Law. In 2020, Banks was elected Member of the Council on Foreign Relations.

== Life ==
Banks is the daughter of two college professors. Her father, James A. Banks, researched education and social justice. Banks and her younger sister were raised in Seattle. She first became interested in law when her father shared stories about growing up in the segregated Arkansas Delta under Jim Crow.

Banks completed a B.A. in sociology, summa cum laude, at Spelman College in 1995. She earned a Master of Letters in sociology at University of Oxford in 1998 as a Marshall Scholar. She graduated from Harvard Law School in 2000. Banks was an editor of the Harvard Law Review and the Harvard International Law Journal.

Banks worked as a teaching and legal fellow at the Harvard Law School. She was a legal advisor for Gabrielle Kirk McDonald at the Iran–United States Claims Tribunal. Banks worked as an associate for Wilmer, Cutler & Pickering and as a law clerk for Carlos F. Lucero of the United States Court of Appeals for the Tenth Circuit. From 2007 to 2017, she was a professor of law at the William & Mary Law School. Since 2017, Banks has served as the Charles J. Merriam distinguished professor of law at the Sandra Day O'Connor College of Law. In July 2026, she began serving as interim dean for ASU Law. In 2020, she was elected to the Council on Foreign Relations in 2020.

In 2021, Banks published her first book, Civic Education in the Age of Mass Migration: Implications for Theory and Practice. Teachers College Press. 2021. ISBN 978-0-8077-6580-7.

Banks has two children.
