= Nicole M. Joseph =

American mathematician

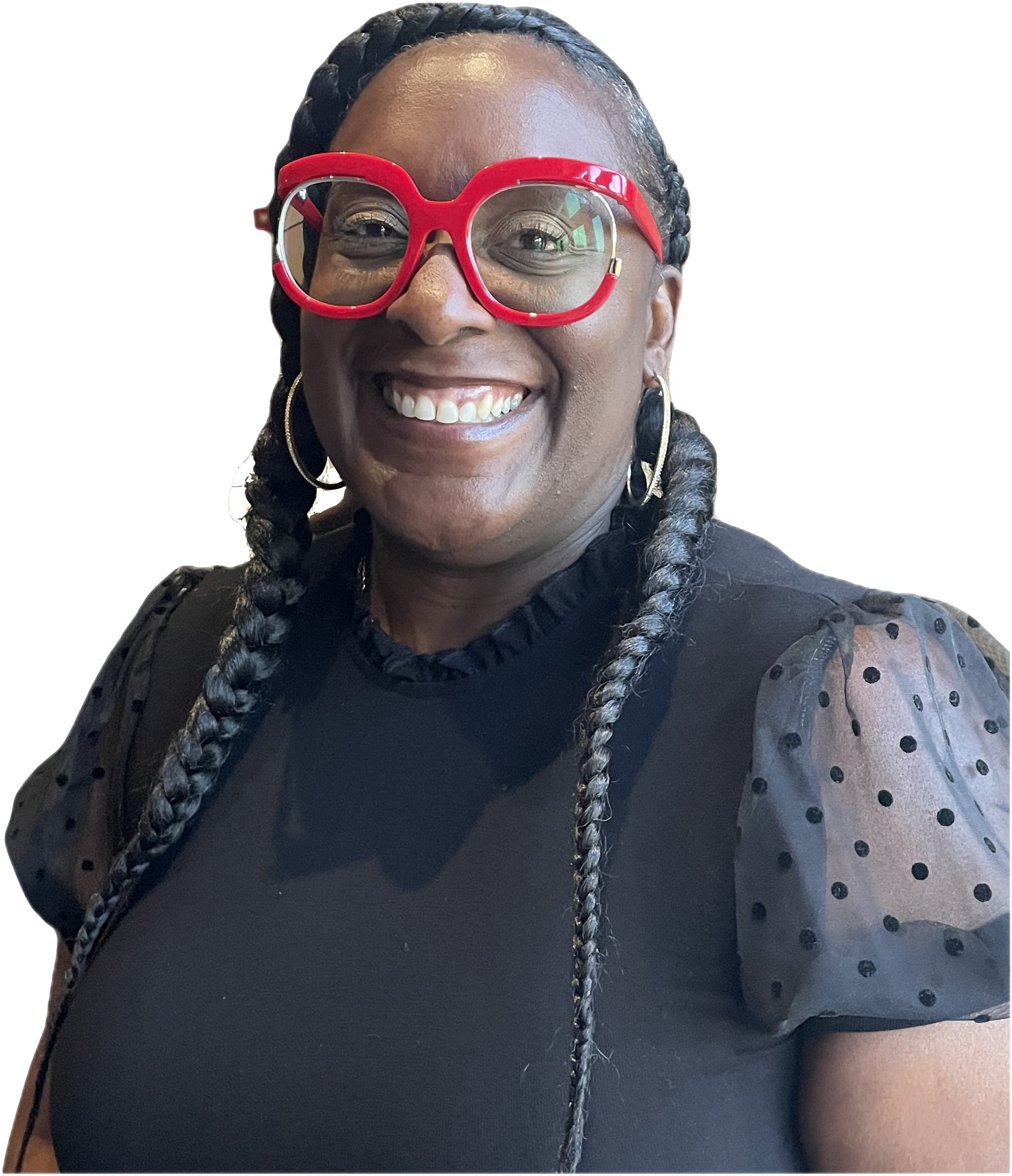
Nicole Joseph Sept 2023

Nicole Michelle Joseph is an American mathematician and scholar of mathematics education whose research particularly focuses on the experiences of African-American girls and women in mathematics, on the effects of white supremacist reactions to their work in mathematics, and on the "intersectional nature of educational inequity". She is an associate professor of mathematics education, in the Department of Teaching and Learning of the Vanderbilt Peabody College of Education and Human Development.

== Education and career ==
Joseph is African American, and is originally from Seattle. After a fall-out with a racist teacher in her elementary school, she was moved to the only open class, an advanced and self-paced classroom in which she first developed a love for mathematics.

She majored in economics, with a minor in mathematics, at Seattle University, where she earned a bachelor's degree in business administration in 1993. After "a few years in the business world", she began working in the Seattle area as a middle school and elementary school mathematics teacher, and as a mathematics coach, from 1999 to 2011. During this period she also studied at Pacific Oaks College Northwest, a former Seattle satellite campus of Pacific Oaks College, a private Quaker college in California. Through Pacific Oaks, she earned a teaching certification for Washington in 2000, and a master's degree in human development in 2003.

In 2011, Joseph completed a Ph.D. in Curriculum & Instruction at the University of Washington. Her dissertation, Black Students and Mathematics Achievement: A Mixed-Method Analysis of In-School and Out-of-School Factors Shaping Student Success, was supervised by James A. Banks. In the same year, she earned a national certification in adolescent mathematics teaching through the National Board for Professional Teaching Standards.

After completing her doctorate, Joseph joined the University of Denver in 2011 as an assistant professor, focusing on educating future mathematics teachers. She moved to Vanderbilt University in 2016, and was tenured there as an associate professor in 2021.

In 2023, while serving as an associate dean at Peabody College, Joseph and two colleagues faced backlash for their use of ChatGPT as they crafted an email to the entire Vanderbilt community. Their message came in the wake of a shooting at Michigan State University.

== Books ==
Joseph is the author or editor of books including:

- Interrogating Whiteness and Relinquishing Power: White Faculty's Commitment to Racial Consciousness in STEM Classrooms (edited with C. M. Haynes and F. Cobb, Peter Lang Publishers, 2016)
- Understanding the Intersections of Race, Gender, and Gifted Education: An Anthology by and About Talented Black Girls and Women in STEM (edited, Information Age Publishing, 2020)
- Making Black Girls Count in Math: A Black Feminist Vision of Transformative Teaching (Harvard Education Press, 2022)

== Recognition ==
Joseph was the winner of the 2023 Louise Hay Award of the Association for Women in Mathematics, "recognized for her contributions to mathematics education that reflect the values of taking risks and nurturing students’ academic talent".
