= Chokepoint Capitalism =

2022 book by Rebecca Giblin and Cory Doctorow

- Author: Rebecca Giblin; Cory Doctorow
- Language: English
- Genre: Non-fiction
- Publisher: Scribe, Beacon Press
- Publication date: September 27, 2022
- Publication place: Australia, UK, US
- Pages: 312 pages
- ISBN: 9-780-80700-7068

Chokepoint Capitalism: How Big Tech and Big Content Captured Creative Labor Markets and How We'll Win Them Back is a non-fiction book by Rebecca Giblin and Cory Doctorow, published in 2022 by Scribe in Australia and the UK and Beacon Press in the United States. Chokepoint Capitalism is also a term coined by Giblin and Doctorow to describe the phenomenon of powerful corporations systematically "chokepointing" their markets by locking in buyers and sellers, eliminating competition, and eventually using their market power to squeeze out more than a fair share of value.

While Giblin and Doctorow argue chokepoints are a defining feature of modern economies, the book primarily focuses on chokepoints in creative markets.

== Synopsis ==
In the first half of the book, Giblin and Doctorow argue that companies including Amazon, Audible, Spotify, Live Nation and Google (via control of ad markets and via YouTube), have created monopsony markets where they are functionally the only buyers in creative labour markets. This gives them the power to extract more value from creative workers and investors than would be possible in a competitive market.

The authors argue that each of these corporations uses the same playbook to capture markets: first locking in users, then locking in suppliers, and then eliminating competition. They demonstrate these techniques in action across a range of creative markets, including physical and audio books, news, recorded music, music streaming, app development and screenwriting.

The book’s second half proposes a range of ideas for widening these chokepoints out, offering technical, commercial and legal blueprints for artists, fans, arts organisations, technologists and policymakers from local government right up to the level of international treaties.

== Reception ==
A starred review in Publishers Weekly describes the book as "a must-read for anyone involved in these industries." In a review for The Guardian, Kitty Drake writes, "The level of detail in the book will make your eyeballs hurt, but it bears fruit." In The Conversation, Justin O'Connor describes the book as "a wake-up call." Oscar Williams writes in a review for the New Statesman that the "book provides practical steps towards rebalancing the cultural economy and empowering the people whose work drives others' profits." In a review for the Journal of Librarianship and Scholarly Communication, Marco Schirone writes that the book "can be read as a scholarly work in the field of intellectual property law and as a critical tool for activism."

The book has received praise from figures including writers Margaret Atwood and David Sirota, comedian Stephen Fry, law professors Zephyr Teachout, Lawrence Lessig, and Jane C. Ginsburg, and Wikipedia co-founder Jimmy Wales. The book was listed in the Financial Times best books of 2022, where economist Tim Harford called it "nerdy, sharp, radical and readable." It also provided inspiration to former Writers Guild of America President David A. Goodman in writing the Futurama season 8 episode ‘Related to Items You’ve Viewed’.

== See also ==
- Enshittification
- Platform capitalism
- Vendor lock-in
- Network effect
- Technofeudalism
