= Robin DiAngelo =

American academic (born 1956)

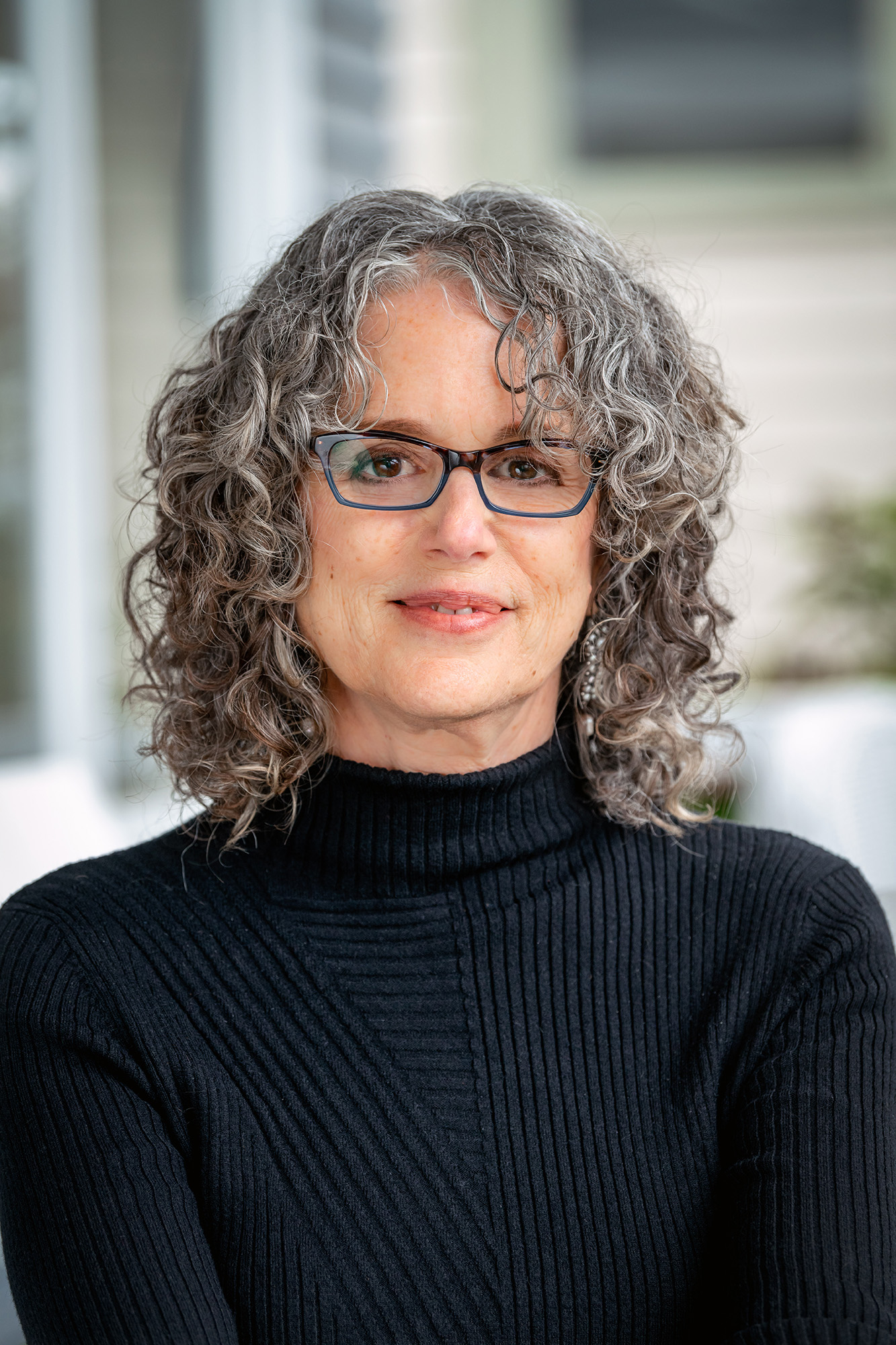
- DiAngelo in 2020
- Born: Robin Jeanne Taylor; September 8, 1956 (age 70)
- Occupations: Author, consultant
- Spouse: Jason Toews

Academic background
- Education: University of Washington; Seattle University
- Thesis: Whiteness in racial dialogue: a discourse analysis (2004)
- Doctoral advisor: James A. Banks

Academic work
- Discipline: Education
- Sub-discipline: Whiteness studies Critical discourse analysis
- Institutions: Westfield State University
- Notable works: White Fragility
- Notable ideas: White fragility
- Website: www.robindiangelo.com

Robin Jeanne DiAngelo (née Taylor; born September 8, 1956) is an American author working in the fields of critical discourse analysis and whiteness studies. She formerly served as a tenured professor of multicultural education at Westfield State University and is currently an affiliate associate professor of education at the University of Washington. She is known for her work pertaining to "white fragility", an expression she coined in 2011 and explored further in a 2018 book titled White Fragility: Why It's So Hard for White People to Talk About Racism.

== Early life ==
DiAngelo was born Robin Jeanne Taylor into a working-class family in San Jose, California, the youngest of three daughters born to Robert Z. Taylor and Maryanne Jeanne DiAngelo.

She lived with her mother in poverty until her mother's death from cancer, after which she and her siblings lived with her father. She became a single mother with one child in her mid-20s, and worked as a waitress before beginning college at the age of 30.

In her youth, she believed that her poverty led to class oppression, though it was only later in life that she believed she was benefiting from white privilege, even while being "poor and white". In 2018, DiAngelo stated that her "experience of poverty would have been different had [she] not been white".

== Education and career ==
DiAngelo earned a B.A. with a double major in sociology and history from Seattle University in 1991, graduating summa cum laude as class valedictorian.

DiAngelo received her Ph.D. in multicultural education from the University of Washington in 2004, completing a dissertation titled Whiteness in racial dialogue: a discourse analysis. Her Ph.D. committee was chaired by James A. Banks. In 2007, she joined the faculty of Westfield State University, where she was named associate professor of multicultural education in 2014. She resigned in 2015. She now serves as affiliate associate professor of education at the University of Washington. She holds honorary doctoral degrees from Starr King Seminary (2019) and Lewis & Clark College (2017).

For over 20 years, DiAngelo has offered racial justice training for schools, nonprofit organizations, universities, and businesses, arguing that racism is embedded throughout American political systems and culture. In a 2019 article for The New Yorker, columnist Kelefa Sanneh characterized DiAngelo as "perhaps the country's most visible expert in anti-bias training, a practice that is also an industry, and, from all appearances, a prospering one".

== Publications ==
DiAngelo has published a number of academic articles and books on race, privilege, and education. In 2011, she co-wrote with Ozlem Sensoy Is Everyone Really Equal? An Introduction to Key Concepts in Critical Social Justice Education, which won the American Educational Research Association's Critics' Choice Book Award (2012) and the Society of Professors of Education Book Award (2018).

That year, DiAngelo published a paper titled "White Fragility" in The International Journal of Critical Pedagogy, thereby coining the term. She has defined the concept of white fragility as "a state in which even a minimum amount of racial stress becomes intolerable, triggering a range of defensive moves". In the paper, she wrote:

White people in the U.S. and other white settler colonialist societies live in a racially insular social environment. This insulation builds our expectations for racial comfort while at the same time lowering our stamina for enduring racial stress. I term this lack of racial stamina White Fragility. White Fragility is a state in which even a minimal challenge to the white position becomes intolerable, triggering a range of defensive moves including: argumentation, invalidation, silence, withdrawal and claims of being attacked and misunderstood. These moves function to reinstate white racial equilibrium and maintain control.

Since 2016, DiAngelo has regularly led workshops on the topic. In 2017, the term "white fragility" was shortlisted by the Oxford Dictionary for Word of the Year.

In June 2018, DiAngelo published White Fragility: Why It's So Hard for White People to Talk About Racism, which debuted on the New York Times bestseller list and remained there for 155 weeks. It has been translated into eleven languages, including French, Italian, German, Japanese, Dutch, and Portuguese.

By 2020, DiAngelo had become a leading figure in the field of antiracism training. The efficacy of this training is disputed.

In June 2020, during the George Floyd protests, White Fragility reached number one on the New York Times list. The July 26, 2020 edition of the list marked the book's 97th week in the Paperback Nonfiction category, where it was ranked number one. The book received mixed critical reception, with positive reviews in sources including New Statesman, The New Yorker, Publishers Weekly, and the Los Angeles Review of Books, and negative reviews in sources including The Atlantic and The Washington Post. Publishers Weekly praised the book as "a thoughtful, instructive, and comprehensive book on challenging racism." Isaac Chotiner, in The New Yorker, wrote that in the wake of the murder of George Floyd and the rise of the Black Lives Matter movement, DiAngelo's book served as a guide for many of the millions of Americans questioning systemic racism, though he notes that some critics have described her definition of white fragility as broad, reductive, and condescending towards people of color.

In June 2021, DiAngelo published Nice Racism: How Progressive White People Perpetuate Racial Harm, a continuation of White Fragility.

She was featured in the 2024 Daily Wire anti-DEI mockumentary Am I Racist?, in which she is shown paying $30 in reparations to the documentary's Black producer. DiAngelo was paid $15,000 for her appearance. She subsequently donated that sum to the NAACP Legal Defense Fund after realizing she "had been played" by the filmmakers.

In August 2024, DiAngelo's doctoral dissertation, Whiteness in racial dialogue: A discourse analysis from the University of Washington, came under media scrutiny when a confidential complaint of plagiarism was made public by the Washington Free Beacon. While at least one of the people DiAngelo is alleged to have plagiarized from, Sherene Razack, was not concerned by the allegations, an independent specialist in academic integrity, Mike Reddy, reviewing the evidence concluded that “the frequency and severity would show evidence of knowing plagiarism of texts” and that withdrawal of DiAngelo's PhD would be a “reasonable consequence of a valid investigation.” On September 11, 2024, the University of Washington dismissed the complaint, stating that it "...falls short of a research misconduct allegation that would give rise to an inquiry."

== Works ==
- DiAngelo, R. (2012). What Does it Mean to be White?: Developing White Racial Literacy. Counterpoints (New York, N.Y.). Peter Lang. ISBN 978-1-4331-1116-7.
- Sensoy, O.; DiAngelo, R. (2017). Is Everyone Really Equal?: An Introduction to Key Concepts in Social Justice Education. Multicultural Education Series (2nd ed.). Teachers College Press. ISBN 978-0-8077-5861-8.
- DiAngelo, R. (2018). White Fragility: Why It's So Hard for White People to Talk about Racism. Beacon Press. ISBN 978-0-8070-4741-5.
- DiAngelo, R. (2021). Nice Racism: How Progressive White People Perpetuate Racial Harm. Beacon Press. ISBN 978-0-8070-7412-1.
