= Leah Gaskin Fitchue =

American administrator (1940–2019)

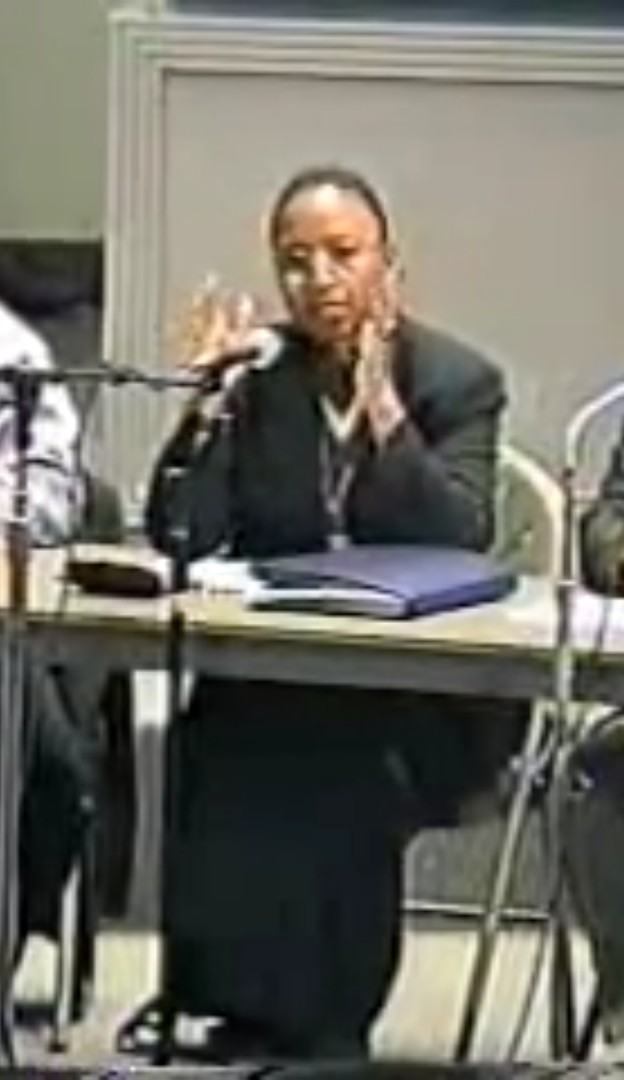
- Born: June 27, 1940; West Palm Beach, Florida
- Died: June 18, 2019 (aged 78)
- Other names: Leah Gaskin White, Leah Gaskin Coles
- Occupations: City official, college administrator
- Known for: President of Payne Theological Seminary

Leah Gaskin Fitchue (June 27, 1940 – June 18, 2019), also known as Leah Gaskin White and Leah Gaskin Coles, was an American city official, professor of religious studies and college administrator. She was president of Payne Theological Seminary from 2003 to 2015.

== Early life ==
Leah Doretha Gaskin Fitchue was born in West Palm Beach, Florida and raised in Philadelphia, the daughter of Joseph James Matchett and Rosie Lee Jones. She earned a bachelor's degree at Rutgers University, a master's degree from the University of Michigan, a Master of Divinity degree from Princeton Theological Seminary, and an Ed.D. degree from the Harvard Graduate School of Education in 1974.

== Career ==
Fitchue was ordained as an iterant elder in the African Methodist Episcopal Church (AME Church). From 1968 to 1970, she was education director of the Philadelphia Urban League. She was the appointed head of the Philadelphia Commission on Human Relations from 1984 to 1992; the city later investigated and sued her for misuse of funds related to that position.

Fitchue was a professor of religious studies at Hampton University. She was the first black woman faculty member at Eastern Baptist Theological Seminary, and the first woman to earn tenure there. She was vice president and academic dean at the Interdenominational Theological Center in Atlanta, and president of the Gaskin-Fitchue Group, a consulting firm.

Fitchue served as president of Payne Theological Seminary in Ohio from her installation in 2004 to her retirement in 2015. She was the school's first woman president, the first African-American woman to serve as president of an accredited theological seminary, and the first woman to serve as head of any historically black theological seminary in the United States. During her tenure as president, Payne began offering online degrees, and began building a doctor of ministry degree. “There is no greater opportunity than improving a system when old structures are beginning to give way,” she told a Harvard publication in 2012.

She contributed a chapter to the essay collection Contesting Post-Racialism: Conflicted Churches in the United States and South Africa. In her last year, she taught an innovative course on theology, crime, and public policy through the Inside-Out Prison Exchange Program, with students from both Virginia Theological Seminary and the Alexandria Detention Center.

In 2015, the Dr. Leah Gaskin Fitchue Bikeway was dedicated in Xenia, Ohio.

== Personal life ==
Leah Gaskin married Anthony Fitchue in 1974; they divorced in 1978. She married Dr. Charles Coles in 1991. She died in 2019, aged 78 years. Her gravesite is in Frazer, Pennsylvania. She was survived by a daughter, Ebony Joy Fitchue.
