= Julia Chinyere Oparah =

Julia Chinyere Oparah Doctor
- Title: Provost Dean

Academic background
- Education: University of Warwick

Julia Chinyere Oparah, formerly Julia Sudbury, is a faculty member at the University of San Francisco. She is also the founder of the Center for Liberated Leadership in Oakland, California. Oparah is an activist-scholar, a community organizer, and an intellectual focused on producing relevant scholarship in accompaniment to social justice movements. She has worked at University of California, Berkeley, University of Toronto, and Mills College prior to the University of San Francisco.

== Early life ==
Oparah was born in Edinburgh, Scotland to a white mother and a black father. She said that she was born when single mothers and particularly single mothers with interracial children, were not looked at in a positive light. Her mother decided that she wasn’t able to raise her and Julia was put into the foster care system as a baby. She eventually moved to Winchester, England where she grew up and went to school.

== Education ==
Oparah graduated with her bachelor's degree with honours from Clare College, Cambridge, in 1989, having studied modern and medieval languages (Spanish and German). She then received a diploma with distinction in community practice from Luton University in 1991. She continued her studies and received a Masters with Distinction from the Centre for Race Relations in Race and Ethnic Studies, University of Warwick, in 1994, and she completed her studies at Warwick in 1997 with a PhD in sociology.

== Teaching and scholarship ==
Oparah's teaching and scholarship have focused on issues of racial and gender justice including topics such as mass incarceration and prison abolition, women of color organizing, transracial families and adoption, and Black women and birthing justice. She has worked closely with community leaders and activists to co-create research that serves the community. Her most recent book with Alicia Bonaparte titled, Birthing Justice: Black Women, Pregnancy and Childbirth is going into its second edition in 2023. Her teaching career began in the spring of 1997 at UC Berkeley. Shortly thereafter, she was hired as an assistant professor at Mills College where she taught in the Ethnic Studies Department for over twenty years. Oparah left Mills briefly to serve as Canada Research Chair in Social Justice at the University of Toronto from 2004 to 2006. Back at Mills, Oparah chaired the Ethnic Studies Department, hosted the National Ethnic Studies Association annual conference and led several other community-based initiatives with students and faculty. Oparah played a leading role in the establishment of Mills' Public Health and Health Equity program. She was also a leader in Mills College's decision to admit transgender and nonbinary students.

== Higher education leadership ==
After serving as Department Chair and then Associate Provost, Oparah became the Provost and Dean of Faculty at Mills College in 2017. She was the first Black woman to serve in this role. Due to Mills' financial crisis, the Board of Trustees voted to layoff faculty and Oparah was charged with that task and eventually oversaw layoffs of tenured faculty in Philosophy, English, and Ethnic Studies. Following a controversial decision by the Mills Board of Trustees in 2021 to pursue a merger with UC Berkeley, Oparah and then-President Elizabeth Hillman received a vote of "no-confidence" from the Mills College faculty.

Oparah was hired to be Provost and Vice President of Academic Affairs at the University of San Francisco in 2021. She was the first Black woman to hold this position at USF. In 2023 Oparah resigned from this role, rejoined the faculty at USF and founded the Center for Liberated Leadership where she coaches higher education and nonprofit leaders committed to social justice and change in their organizations.

== Bibliography ==
- Other Kinds of Dreams: Black Women's Organizations and the Politics of Transformation. (1998, London and New York: Routledge)
- Global Lockdown: Race, Gender and the Prison-Industrial Complex. (2005, New York: Routledge)
- Color of Violence: The Incite! Anthology, (2006, Cambridge, MA: South End Press)
- Outsiders Within: Writing on Transracial Adoption. (2006, Cambridge, MA: South End Press, with Jane Jeong Trenka and Sun Yung Shin, eds)
- Activist Scholarship: Antiracism, Feminism and Social Change (2009, Boulder, CO: Paradigm Publishers, with Margo Okazawa-Rey, eds)
- Birthing Justice: Black Women, Pregnancy and Childbirth, (2015, New York: Routledge, with Alicia D. Bonaparte, eds.)
- Birthing Justice Discussion Guide (2015, New York: Routledge, with Julia Chinyere Oparah and Olivia Polk)

== Awards and honors ==
- Black Women and the Racial Politics of Childbirth, Quigley Summer Research Award 2011.
- Sarlo Award, 2009-2010
- Eugene E. Trefethen Chair, 2008-2009
- Mary S. Metz Professorship for excellence in teaching, 2007-2008
- Canada Research Chair in Social Justice, Equity and Diversity, University of Toronto, 2004-2006
- Academic Initiative Fund, Centre for Aboriginal Initiatives, University of Toronto, 2005
- Association of American University Women Postdoctoral Fellowship, 2002-2003
- Rockefeller Humanities Residency Fellowship, University of Arizona, Tucson, 2002-2003
- Gaea Foundation Summer Residency, 2002
- Meg Quigley Award, Women's Studies Program, Mills College, Summer 2002, 1999, 1998

== Sources ==
- No-Confidence Vote at Mills Amid Closure Plans, via insidehighered.com
- News and Notes: A Bulletin of the AAUP, Mills College Chapter, via ucbfa.org (pdf)
- Oparah Shares about Her Background, Defends Actions at Mills, via sffoghorn.com
