= Paul Ortiz (historian) =

American historian (born 1964)

- Born: 1964 (age 61–62)
- Education: Duke University; Evergreen State College; Olympic Community College
- Scientific career
- Fields: African American History, Latinx Studies, Comparative Race and Ethnicity, Social Movement Theory, Southern History, Labor History, Oral History
- Workplaces: Cornell University

Paul Ortiz (born 1964) is an American historian. He is a professor of labor history at Cornell University and was formerly the director of the Samuel Proctor Oral History Program at the University of Florida.

== Life and education ==
Born in 1964, Paul Ortiz is a third-generation military veteran and a first-generation college graduate. He was a paratrooper and radio operator, attaining the rank of sergeant, in the United States Army from 1982 to 1986 with the 82nd Airborne Division and the 7th Special Forces Group in Central America. He received the US Armed Forces Humanitarian Service Medal for meritorious action in the wake of the eruption of the Nevado del Ruiz stratovolcano in Tolima, Colombia, in November 1985.

Ortiz has served as president and a council member of the United Faculty of Florida UF-FEA/NEA/AFT/ AFL-CIO.

== Publications ==
Ortiz's publications include Emancipation Betrayed (University of California Press) a history of the Black Freedom struggle in Florida, and Remembering Jim Crow: African Americans Tell About Life in the Jim Crow South (New Press). His book awards include the Lillian Smith Book Prize, the Harry T. and Harriett V. Moore Book Prize, and a PEN Oakland Josephine Miles Literary Award. His published essays appear in a wide array of publication venues and types, including Latino Studies, The Oral History Review, Radical History Review, Truthout, Against the Current, Southern Exposure, and popular press in writings about African American and Latino histories and politics. His essay on the radical black abolitionist Henry Highland Garnet (1815-1882) was published in Time Magazine online in 2018.

=== Selected bibliography ===
- An African American and Latinx History of the United States (ReVisioning American History, 2018)
- Emancipation Betrayed University of California Press (2006)
- Remembering Jim Crow by William H. Chafe (Editor), Raymond Gavins (Editor), Robert Korstad (Editor), with Paul Ortíz and others New Press (2008)
