= Anti-bias curriculum =

Educational plan meant to reduce perceived prejudice in education

The anti-bias curriculum is a curriculum which attempts to challenge prejudices such as racism, sexism, ableism, ageism, weightism, homophobia, classism, colorism, heightism, handism, religious discrimination, speciesism and other forms of kyriarchy. The approach is favoured by civil rights organisations such as the Anti-Defamation League. Bias refers to violation of equality based on equal opportunities (formal equality) or based on equality of outcomes for different groups, also called substantive equality.

The anti-racist curriculum is part of a wider social constructivist movement in the various societies of the Western World, where many scientific worldviews are seen as manifestations of Western cultures who enjoy a privileged position over societies from the "Global South", along with claiming that there is a sociocultural aspect to education, i.e. that the studies of these subjects in Western societies have usually exhibited racial and cultural bias, and that they focus too much on "dead white men", especially in mathematics. (Note: See ethnomathematics.)

== Purpose ==
The anti-bias curriculum is seen by its proponents as a catalyst in the critical analysis of various social conditions. It is implemented with the intent of reducing social oppression with the ultimate goal of "social justice" in mind.

== Examples ==
Margaret Thatcher, in a speech made during the Conservative Party Conference of 1987, referred to "hard left education authorities and extremist teachers" teaching "anti-racist mathematics—whatever that may be." and later on in 2005, Fox News carried a story detailing "The 'anti-racist education' program in place at Newton Public Schools."

The article The Politics of Anti-Racist Mathematics by George Gheverghese Joseph goes through many different assumptions made by teachers of mathematics that can have a negative effect on students of ethnic minorities. An anti-racist approach to mathematics education could include any or all of the following:

- Discussion of the mathematical knowledge of ancient civilizations outside of Europe, and non-European contributions to mathematical knowledge and discovery;
- The avoidance of racial stereotypes or cultural bias in classroom material, textbooks, coursework topics and examination questions. For example, a wide range of names from various ethnic backgrounds might be used in word problem questions.

American mathematics instructor Shahid Muhammed has suggested that poor mathematics performance among African Americans is linked to higher anxiety caused by negative stereotyping, as he states that many associate mathematics with middle-class white people.

== Criticism ==
There has been criticism of aspects of the anti-bias curriculum. Eastern Washington University professor Deirdre Almeida has stated that most anti-bias curricula omit the contributions of non-African ethnic groups, such as Native Americans, Inuit and Alaska Natives. Almeida has claimed that portrayals of Native Americans in anti-bias material conflate actual aboriginal practices with invented, obsolete or erroneous ideas about Native American culture.

=== Discrimination ===
University of Tennessee professor J. Amos Hatch has claimed that some anti-bias curricula can be construed as actively or passively adopting a discrimination and anti-European/western racial bias, seeking to minimize contributions of ethnic Europeans in favor of other ethnic groups. Hatch has stated that this ideology has produced "anti-bias" curricula that are overtly biased against people of European descent or in favor of people of African descent.

== See also ==
- The 1619 Project
- Approaches to prejudice reduction
- Bias in curricula
- Cognitive bias mitigation
- Cognitive vulnerability
- Diversity, equity, and inclusion
- Diversity training
- Discrimination in education
- Social justice
- Afrocentric education

Related figures:

- Paulo Freire
- Henry Giroux
- bell hooks (Gloria Jean Watkins)
- Jonathan Kozol

== Notes and references ==
=== Bibliography ===
- Biles, B. (1994). Activities that Promote Racial and Cultural Awareness. "Archived copy" (PDF). Archived from the original (PDF) on 2004-11-14.. Retrieved November 6, 2004, from Family Child Care Connections, 4(3)
- Derman-Sparks, L. (1989). "Creating an Anti-Bias Environment" Chapter 2, in Anti-Bias Curriculum: Tools for Empowering Young Children. New York, NY: National Association for the Education of Young Children.
- Derman-Sparks, L. & Hohensee, J.B. (1992). Implementing an Anti-Bias Curriculum in Early Childhood Classrooms Archived 2004-12-09 at the Wayback Machine. Retrieved November 6, 2004, from ERIC/EECE Digest
- Riehl, P. (1993). Five ways to analyze classrooms for an anti-bias approach Archived 2021-05-01 at the Wayback Machine. Retrieved November 6, 2004, from the National Network for Child Care (NNCC)

=== Further reading ===
- Bartlett, Lesley and Marla Frederick, Thaddeus Gulbrandsen, Enrique Murillo. "The Marketization of Education: Public Schools for Private Ends." Anthropology & Education Quarterly 27.2 (1996): 186–203.
- Ferguson, Ann Arnett. "Bad Boys: Public Schools in the Making of Black Masculinity." (2000): 592–600. Ann Arbor: University of Michigan Press.
- Osborne, A. Barry. "Practice into Theory into Practice: Culturally Relevant Pedagogy for Students We Have Marginalized and Normalized." Anthropology & Education Quarterly 27.3 (1996): 285–314.
- Van Ausdale, Debra and Joe Feagin. "What and How Children Learn About Racial and Ethnic Matters." The First R: How Children Learn Race and Racism. (2001): 175–196. Maryland: Rowman & Littlefield.
