= Diversity training =

Educational program to reduce prejudice and discrimination and improve teamwork

Diversity training is a type of corporate training designed to facilitate positive intergroup interaction, reduce prejudice and discrimination, and teach different individuals how to work together effectively.

Diversity training is often aimed to meet objectives such as attracting and retaining customers and productive workers; maintaining high employee morale; and fostering understanding and harmony between workers.

Despite intended benefits, systematic studies have not proven benefits to diversity training. While some studies show that voluntary diversity training can lead to more diverse management, other studies have found that mandatory diversity training can lead to increased discrimination and prejudice.

As of 2019, more than $8 billion a year is spent on diversity training in the United States.

== History ==
=== 1960s ===
In the 1960s, the concept of promoting diversity in the workplace was prompted as a result of the civil rights movement. The Civil Rights Act of 1964, enacted by the 88th US Congress, made it illegal for employers with more than 15 workers to discriminate against employees and candidates based on race, color, religion, sex, or national origin. Discrimination on the basis of pregnancy, age, and disability was also later outlawed. After the Act was passed, activists protested organizations who refused to hire blacks, planned jobs banks, and filed charges against employers that discriminated against employees.

=== 1970s ===
The United States Supreme Court extended the definition of discrimination in 1971 in Griggs v. Duke Power Co., ruling against employment practices that ostracized black employees without evidence of intent to discriminate. The civil rights movement helped to recreate its momentum for a new round of movements in the 1970s for the rights of women, the disabled, Latinos, and others. With shifts in societal and legal reforms, federal agencies took the first step towards modern day diversity training, and by the end of 1971, the Social Security Administration had enrolled over 50,000 employees through racial bias training. Corporations followed suit and, over the next five years, began offering anti-bias training to their employees. By 1976, 60 percent of large companies offered equal-opportunity training. Many of these corporations implemented such training programs as a way to protect themselves from discrimination lawsuits.

=== 1980s to present ===
In the 1980s, President Ronald Reagan tried to reverse affirmative action regulations put forward by former president John F. Kennedy and appointed Clarence Thomas to run the Equal Employment Opportunity Commission. As a result, diversity trainers in the U.S. began calling for diversity training, arguing that women and minorities would soon be the backbone of the workforce and that companies needed to determine how to include them amongst their ranks. By 2005, 65 percent of large corporations offered their employees some form of diversity training.

Promoting respect and appealing to minority employees and customers became significant goals of diversity training starting in the late 1980s. In the early 2000s, an expansion of diversity training was prompted by a series of high-profile discrimination lawsuits in the financial industry.

== Impact ==
Findings on diversity trainings are mixed. According to Harvard University sociologist Frank Dobbin, there is no evidence to indicate that anti-bias training leads to increases in the number of women or people of color in management positions. A 2009 Annual Review of Psychology study concluded, "We currently do not know whether a wide range of programs and policies tend to work on average," with the authors of the study stating in 2020 that as the quality of studies increases, the effect size of anti-bias training dwindles.

According to a 2006 study in the American Sociological Review, "diversity training and diversity evaluations are least effective at increasing the share of white women, black women, and black men in management." A meta-analysis suggests that diversity training could have a relatively large effect on cognitive-based and skill-based training outcomes. An analysis of data from over 800 firms over 30 years shows that diversity training and grievance procedures backfire and lead to reductions in the diversity of the firms' workforce. A 2013 study found that the presence of a diversity program in a workplace made high-status subjects less likely to take discrimination complaints seriously.

Alexandra Kalev and Frank Dobbin conducted a comprehensive review of cultural diversity training conducted in 830 midsize to large U.S. workplaces over a thirty one-year period. The results showed that diversity training was followed by a decrease of anywhere from 7.5 to 10% in the number of women in management. The percentage of black men in top positions fell by 12 percent. Similar effects were shown for Latinos and Asians. The study did not find that all diversity training is ineffective. Mandatory training programs offered to protect against discrimination lawsuits were called into question. Voluntary diversity training participation to advance organization's business goals was associated with increased diversity at the management level; voluntary services resulted in near triple digit increases for black, Hispanic, and Asian men.

A 2021 meta-analysis found a lack of high quality studies on the efficacy of diversity training. The researchers concluded that "while the small number of experimental studies provide encouraging average effects... the effects shrink when the trainings are conducted in real-world workplace settings, when the outcomes are measured at a greater time distance than immediately following the intervention, and, most importantly, when the sample size is large enough to produce reliable results."

A 2013 study found that white men were less likely to think a complaint of discrimination by an employee was accurate when they were told that the employer used diversity training, even when they were presented with evidence of discrimination. Several studies of the results of discrimination lawsuits in the United States have found that official diversity structures, including diversity training, have increasingly been accepted by judges as evidence of a lack of discrimination regardless of their effectiveness. According to Nakamura & Edelman's summary of corporate diversity policies, "[i]n the twenty-first century, diversity commitments and policies are standard and firms that lack such structures look suspect."

== See also ==
- Anti-bias curriculum
- Cognitive bias mitigation
- Diversity (business)
- Diversity (politics)
- Diversity, equity, and inclusion
- Multiculturalism
- Neurodiversity
- Sensitivity training
