= National Asian Pacific American Bar Association =

American legal organization

The National Asian Pacific American Bar Association (NAPABA) is a nonprofit organization representing Asian Pacific American lawyers in the United States.

== Activities ==
The group has advocated for the nomination and confirmation of more Asian American judges to the federal courts.

In 2000, the group led a consortium of Asian American organizations that called for a bipartisan independent inquiry in the Wen Ho Lee case, including whether the investigation of Lee, a former scientist of Los Alamos National Laboratory, was tainted by anti-Asian bias.

Along with other civil rights groups (including other Asian American advocacy organizations), NAPABA has joined amicus briefs defending affirmative action. It did so in the Grutter, Fisher I, Fisher II, and Students for Fair Admissions v. Harvard and UNC cases. In 2018, NAPABA, along with other civil rights groups, also submitted an amicus brief in support of Hawaii in the Trump v. Hawaii challenge to Trump's "Muslim ban" executive order.

In 2017, NAPABA and a group of Yale Law School students co-published a study critiquing the lack of Asian American representation in major legal positions. The study found that although Asian Americans made up 10% of graduates at elite law schools (more than Asian American's overall share of the U.S. population, 6%), few Asian Americans were underrepresented among U.S. Attorneys (at the time, only 3 of the 94 U.S. Attorneys were Asian American), state elected prosecutors (4 of the 2,437 were Asian Americans), federal judges, state judges, and law school deans. Justice Goodwin Liu of the California Supreme Court was one of the authors of the report.

A follow-up study in 2022 (entitled A Portrait of Asian Americans in the Law 2.0) was a collaboration between the NAPABA, the American Bar Foundation, and several law schools; it found that Asian Americans had progress in increasing representation in many areas within the legal profession (including the proportion of Asian Americans among active federal judges and Fortune 1000 corporate general counsels), but remained stagnant in other areas (including the proportion of Asian Americans among U.S. Attorneys and equity partners at major law firms). Liu also co-authored the 2022 report.
