= Edward Blum (activist) =

American conservative legal activist

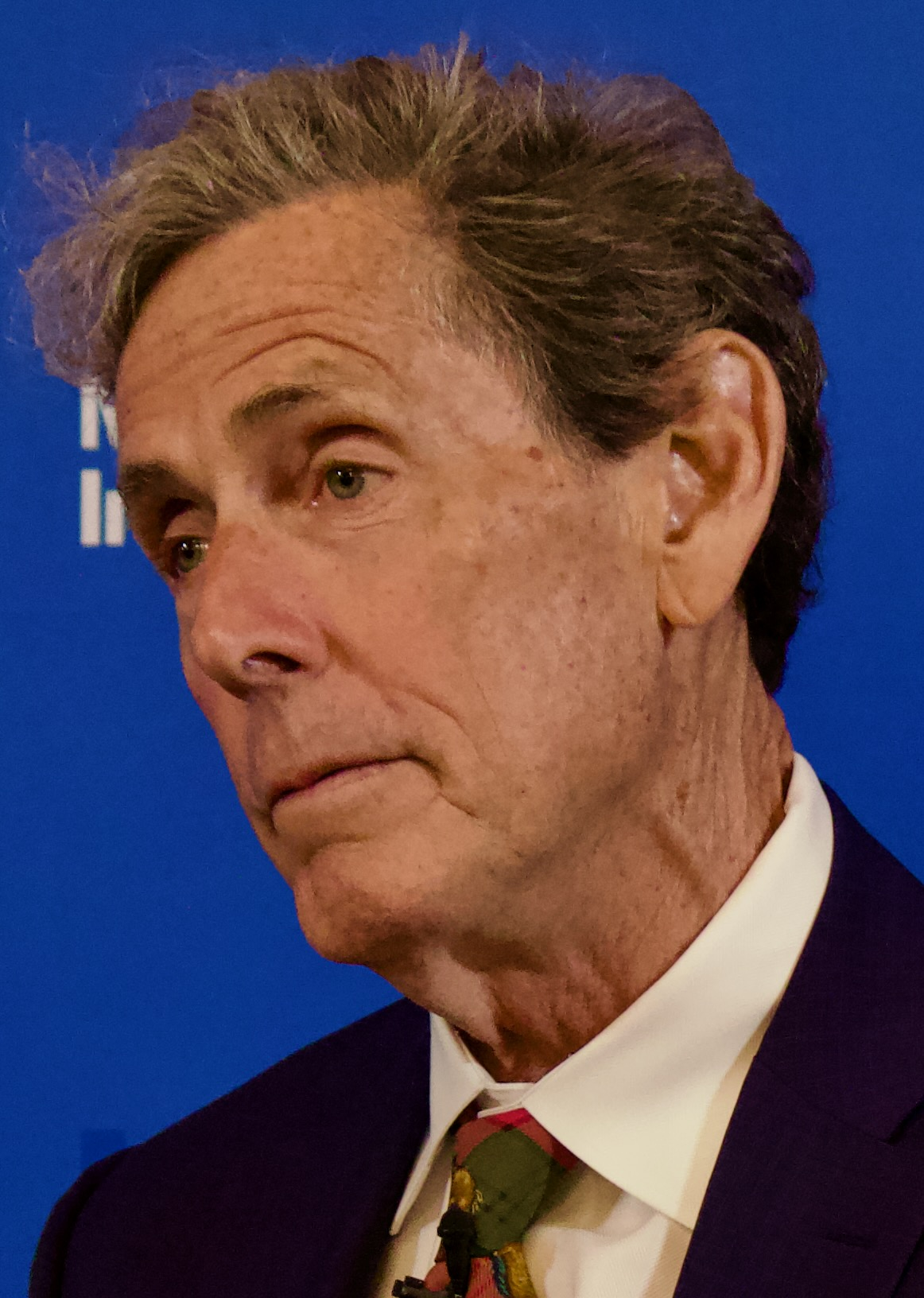
- Blum in 2025
- Born: Edward Jay Blum; January 9, 1952 (age 74); Benton Harbor, Michigan, U.S.
- Education: University of Texas at Austin (BA)
- Political party: Republican

Edward Jay Blum (born January 9, 1952) is an American conservative activist who opposes classifications and preferences based on race and ethnicity.

Since the 1990s, Blum has been heavily involved in bringing eight cases to the United States Supreme Court. He was a key figure in Bush v. Vera and the Students for Fair Admissions v. Harvard lawsuits.

Blum is the director of the Project on Fair Representation, which he founded in 2005 and operates alone.

== Early life and education ==
Blum was born in 1952 into a Jewish family in Benton Harbor, Michigan, where his parents owned and operated a shoe store. He graduated from the University of Texas at Austin in 1973. He then studied at the State University of New York at New Paltz. He describes his parents as generally left-wing liberals who supported Democratic presidents like Franklin Roosevelt and Harry S. Truman and that he was, eventually, "the first Republican my mother ever met". He has said that the anti-Semitic discrimination his family experienced during his youth helped form his beliefs.

== Political activism ==
While working as a stockbroker in Houston, Texas, in the early 1980s, he became involved in the neoconservatism movement. In 1990, he realized that the Democratic incumbent in his congressional district, Craig Anthony Washington, was running unopposed, so decided to run against him for the Republican Party. During that campaign, Blum and his wife Lark went door-knocking and realized that the boundaries of their district erratically divided streets based on ethnicity, with the suspected purpose to gerrymander a majority African-American district in order to grant increased voting power to minorities. Blum eventually lost the congressional race. But he and others filed a lawsuit against the state of Texas, claiming that the racially gerrymandered districts violated the Fourteenth Amendment. The case, Bush v. Vera, went to the Supreme Court, which ruled in Blum's favor.

== Legal activism ==
Blum holds a fellowship at the American Enterprise Institute (AEI) where his areas of research include civil rights policy, affirmative action, multiculturalism, and redistricting. He wrote the 2007 book The Unintended Consequences of Section 5 of the Voting Rights Act.

His litigation includes United States Supreme Court cases Bush v. Vera (1996), Northwest Austin Municipal Utility District No. 1 v. Holder (2009), Fisher v. University of Texas (2013), Shelby County v. Holder (2013), Evenwel v. Abbott (2016), and Fisher v. University of Texas II (2016).

In Shelby County, the Supreme Court struck down Section 4 of the Voting Rights Act of 1965, which subjected certain states and parts of states to federal scrutiny when they tried to modify voting procedures. This scrutiny, known as "preclearance", was intended to prevent states from enacting voting procedures that disproportionately burden racial minorities. After unsuccessfully lobbying Congress to modify the preclearance rules in the Act's 2006 reauthorization, Blum set out to challenge the Act's constitutionality in court. He wanted to change or eliminate the law because it had led to the pro-minority gerrymandering that he encountered in the 1990s when he ran for Congress. Blum convinced Shelby County to file suit after trolling government websites and cold calling a county official. He secured lawyers to represent them and funded the litigation with monies provided by conservative donors.

In Evenwel, Texas voters sued Texas in a constitutional test case. Texas, like other states, divides its state legislative districts in a way that equalizes the total population of each district. However, some districts have more eligible voters than others because they have fewer minors, non-citizen immigrants, and convicted felons. The plaintiffs contended that this discriminates against voters in districts with high numbers of eligible voters since each person's vote has less power. They wanted the Supreme Court to mandate that districts be drawn based on voter-eligible population rather than total population. In an April 2016 ruling, the Supreme Court upheld Texas's district scheme.

The Fisher case, which challenged the University of Texas's (UT) consideration of race in its undergraduate admissions process, was decided at the Supreme Court in 2013 and again in 2016. The first time, the Court bolstered the legal standard that universities must satisfy if they wish to consider race, emphasizing that the use of race is only permissible if race-neutral alternatives would be ineffective at producing campus diversity. The second time, the Court applied the heightened legal standard to UT's admission policy, concluding that it passes muster and upholding it. Blum sought out the plaintiffs in the Fisher case, persuaded them to file suit, and obtained legal representation for them as well as funding from wealthy conservative donors to fund the case.

The Harvard Crimson reported that his work is funded by conservative trusts and foundations, including Donors Trust, the Searle Freedom Trust, the Sarah Scaife Foundation, and The 85 Fund. Slate also describes Blum and his organization as recipients of wealthy and powerful right-wing benefactors.

=== Legal challenges to race-conscious admissions ===
Other than the University of Texas, Blum has challenged race-conscious admissions policies at universities including Harvard University and the University of North Carolina at Chapel Hill, claiming that they do not comply with the strict legal standard set forth in Fisher. To that end, he founded Students for Fair Admissions, an offshoot of the Project on Fair Representation. SFFA was formed to clearly articulate Blum’s view that race preferences are morally wrong. Blum has publicly stated: "SFFA’s guiding principle is that race-based admissions policies, no matter how well-intentioned, are unfair, deeply polarizing, and illegal. These policies have led to the systematic discrimination of certain groups, particularly Asian-Americans, in favor of others. This is not just a legal or political issue; it is a moral issue. It is about the kind of society we want to be, the values we want to uphold, and the future we want to create for our children and grandchildren.”

This organization solicits individuals who claim to have been rejected by higher education institutions admissions departments and engages in lawsuits on their behalf. Websites were set up to solicit complainants in connection with Harvard, the University of North Carolina, and also the University of Wisconsin at Madison. In November 2014, Students for Fair Admissions, led by Blum, filed federal lawsuits against Harvard and UNC-Chapel Hill. The lawsuit against Harvard alleged that Harvard discriminated against Asian American applicants. The lawsuit against UNC-Chapel Hill alleged discrimination against Asian American and white applicants.

The Harvard case revealed that Harvard gave a “personal” rating to its applicants, and that Asian American applicants had higher academic scores than other applicants but a lower “personal” rating than other applicants. Even though alumni interviewers gave Asian Americans “personal” ratings comparable to white applicants, the Harvard admissions office gave Asian Americans the worst “personal” rating of any group. On October 1, 2019, a District Court ruled in favor of Harvard University. In the 130-page ruling, Judge Allison D. Burroughs found that the University did not discriminate on the basis of race, did not engage in racial balancing or the use of quotas, and did not place too much emphasis on race when considering an applicant’s admissions file. She also wrote that "Harvard has demonstrated that no workable and available race-neutral alternatives would allow it to achieve a diverse student body while still maintaining its standards for academic excellence." SFFA petitioned the Supreme Court to review both the First Circuit's decision in the Harvard case and a similar decision from the Middle District of North Carolina, Students for Fair Admissions v. University of NC, et al., which focused on the impact on both Caucasian and Asian American applicants at the University of North Carolina and which had been decided in the school's favor in October 2021. On June 29, 2023, the Supreme Court issued a decision that, by a vote of 6–3, reversed the lower court ruling. In writing the majority opinion, Chief Justice John Roberts held that using race as an explicit “plus” factor in college admissions is unconstitutional. His opinion pointed out, “The First Circuit found that Harvard’s consideration of race has led to an 11.1% decrease in the number of Asian-Americans admitted to Harvard. 980 F. 3d, at 170, n. 29. And the District Court observed that Harvard’s ‘policy of considering applicants’ race... overall results in fewer Asian American and white students being admitted.’ 397 F. Supp. 3d, at 178.” Justice Roberts also emphasized, “The race-based admissions systems... fail to comply with the twin commands of the Equal Protection Clause that race may never be used as a ‘negative’ and that it may not operate as a stereotype.”

In September 2023, SFFA filed a lawsuit challenging the use of race and ethnicity as admissions factors at the United States Military Academy, as the Supreme Court exempted military academies from its ruling in Students for Fair Admissions v. Harvard. In February 2024 the organization was blocked from appealing a decision to the Supreme Court where it failed in lower courts to stop West Point from using race as a factor in admissions to the military academy.

=== Lawsuits against diversity requirements in businesses ===
Blum is the president of the Alliance for Fair Board Recruitment, an organization opposed to diversity requirements on corporate boards. The organisation is the plaintiff in lawsuits challenging diversity requirements for boards of certain publicly traded companies. The group sued to challenge California's race and gender quotas, and the Security Exchange Commission's approval of Nasdaq's comply-or-explain rule. California's race and gender quotas were found to be unconstitutional, and struck down. In December 2024, the US Court of Appeals for the Fifth Circuit held in Alliance for Fair Board Recruitment v. SEC that the SEC lacked the authority to approve the Nasdaq's rule.

Blum continued his campaign against diversity mandates, particularly focusing on race. He founded a Texas group to file lawsuits the American Alliance for Equal Rights. The group's first lawsuit was in 2023 against the Fearless Fund, a venture capital fund that supports Black women business owners. It was founded to award grants to Black women who own small businesses through one of its programs, Strivers Grant. Blum's lawsuit challenges the legality of the grantmaking program under Section 1981 of the Civil Rights Act of 1866. In September 2024, Fearless Fund agreed to settle and announced it shut down its Strivers Grant program.

== Works ==
- Blum, Edward (2007). The Unintended Consequences of Section 5 of the Voting Rights Act. AEI Press. ISBN 9780844742571.
