= Constitutional colorblindness =

Aspect of United States Supreme Court case evaluation

Constitutional colorblindness is a legal and philosophical principle suggesting that the Constitution of the United States, particularly the Equal Protection Clause of the 14th Amendment, should be interpreted as prohibiting the government from considering race in its laws, policies, or decisions. According to this doctrine, any use of racial classifications, whether intended to benefit or disadvantage certain groups, is viewed as inherently discriminatory and thus unconstitutional.

== Historical development ==
The concept of constitutional colorblindness can be traced back to Justice John Marshall Harlan's dissent in the Supreme Court's decision in Plessy v. Ferguson (1896), which upheld racial segregation under the "separate but equal" doctrine. Harlan wrote,

I am of the opinion that the statute of Louisiana is inconsistent with the personal liberties of citizens, white and black, in that State, and hostile to both the spirit and the letter of the Constitution of the United States. If laws of like character should be enacted in the several States of the Union, the effect would be in the highest degree mischievous. Slavery as an institution tolerated by law would, it is true, have disappeared from our country, but there would remain a power in the States, by sinister legislation, to interfere with the blessings of freedom; to regulate civil rights common to all citizens, upon the basis of race; and to place in a condition of legal inferiority a large body of American citizens, now constituting a part of the political community, called the people of the United States, for whom and by whom, through representatives, our government is administrated. Such a system is inconsistent with the guarantee given by the Constitution to each State of a republican form of government, and may be stricken down by congressional action, or by the courts in the discharge of their solemn duty to maintain the supreme law of the land, anything in the Constitution or laws of any State to the contrary notwithstanding.

Although his dissent did not prevail at the time, it has since been cited in support of the view that the Constitution prohibits racial distinctions of any kind.

The doctrine gained prominence in the late 20th century as part of conservative legal arguments against affirmative action and other race-conscious government policies. Supporters argue that the Equal Protection Clause mandates a race-neutral approach, meaning that laws and policies should not differentiate between individuals based on race, ethnicity, or color.

== Legal interpretation ==
The principle of constitutional colorblindness is grounded in an interpretation of the Equal Protection Clause of the Fourteenth Amendment, which states that no state shall "deny to any person within its jurisdiction the equal protection of the laws." Advocates of colorblindness interpret this clause as requiring that all individuals be treated equally under the law, without regard to race.

Supporters of the doctrine argue that the use of race in government policies, such as affirmative action in education or employment, constitutes a violation of the equal protection guarantee, even if the intention is to remedy past discrimination. According to this view, the Constitution prohibits not only policies that disadvantage racial minorities but also those that give them preferential treatment.

== Supreme Court rulings ==
The concept of constitutional colorblindness has been influential in several major Supreme Court cases involving race and equal protection:

- Regents of the University of California v. Bakke (1978): The Court held that while racial quotas in college admissions were unconstitutional, race could still be considered as one factor among others in a holistic admissions process. However, proponents of colorblindness argue that any consideration of race is inconsistent with the Equal Protection Clause.
- Parents Involved in Community Schools v. Seattle School District No. 1 (2007): The Court ruled that public school districts could not use race as the sole factor in student assignments to schools. Chief Justice John Roberts' majority opinion emphasized the colorblindness doctrine, stating, "The way to stop discrimination on the basis of race is to stop discriminating on the basis of race."
- Fisher v. University of Texas (2013 and 2016): This case challenged the use of race in college admissions. While the Court upheld the university's race-conscious admissions policy, the decisions also reinforced the idea that such policies are subject to strict scrutiny and must be narrowly tailored to achieve the goal of diversity.
- Students for Fair Admissions v. Harvard (2023): The Court ruled that race-based affirmative action programs in college admissions processes violate the Equal Protection Clause. Chief Justice John Roberts in his majority opinion wrote, "Eliminating racial discrimination means eliminating all of it," and Justice Clarence Thomas affirmed his "defense of the colorblind Constitution".

== Criticism ==
Critics of constitutional colorblindness argue that it ignores the enduring impact of historical and systemic racial discrimination. They contend that race-conscious policies, such as affirmative action, are necessary to address the persistent inequalities that continue to affect marginalized communities. According to this view, treating everyone equally without acknowledging racial disparities perpetuates existing inequalities rather than correcting them.

Additionally, some legal scholars argue that the Equal Protection Clause was originally intended to protect racial minorities from oppression, and thus race-conscious remedies aimed at rectifying past injustices are consistent with the Constitution's purpose.

== Contemporary debate ==
Constitutional colorblindness remains a central issue in the broader debate over affirmative action and racial equality in the United States. Proponents advocate for a race-neutral approach to government policies, while opponents emphasize the need for race-conscious efforts to promote diversity and correct systemic inequities. The Supreme Court's rulings on these issues continue to shape the legal landscape regarding race and equal protection.

== See also ==
- Equal Protection Clause
- Affirmative Action
- Plessy v. Ferguson
- Brown v. Board of Education
- Regents of the University of California v. Bakke
- Parents Involved in Community Schools v. Seattle School District No. 1
- Disparate impact
- Louisiana v. Callais
- Allen v. Milligan
- Mullin v. Doe
- Noem v. Vasquez Perdomo
