= Affirmative action at the University of Michigan =

Aspect of culture in academia

The University of Michigan implemented a set of race-conscious admission policies from 1963, during the administration of the university's eighth president, Harlan Hatcher, until 2006, when state law effectively prohibited the practice.

The affirmative measures in the university's admissions process have been the subject of several court cases, two of which reached the U.S. Supreme Court: Gratz v. Bollinger and Grutter v. Bollinger. The admissions practices in Gratz v. Bollinger were ruled unconstitutional on the grounds that they violated the Equal Protection Clause of the Fourteenth Amendment, while in Grutter v. Bollinger, they were upheld. In 2023, the Supreme Court overruled Grutter v. Bollinger in Students for Fair Admissions v. Harvard, determining that affirmative action in student admissions again violated the Equal Protection Clause.

Chief Justice William Rehnquist argued in the case of Grutter v. Bollinger that the university's admissions system was, in fact, a thinly veiled and unconstitutional quota system. U.S. president George W. Bush publicly opposed the admission policies, stating, "I strongly support diversity of all kinds, including racial diversity in higher education. But the method used by the University of Michigan to achieve this important goal is fundamentally flawed".

== History ==
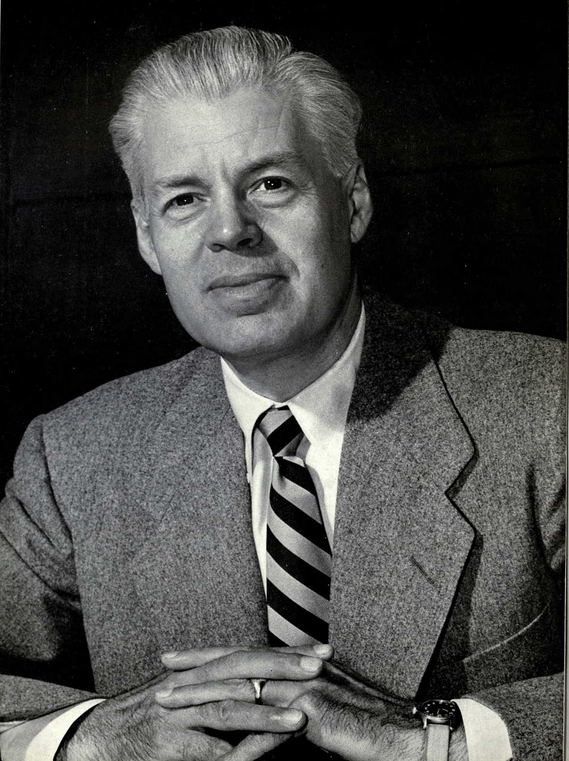
Affirmative action was first implemented at the university during Harlan Hatcher's administration

The idea was originated by Hobart Taylor Jr., the forerunner to the Equal Employment Opportunity Commission. Taylor wanted to increase African Americans' access to the university. He was able to obtain the support of Roger W. Heyns, the university's vice president for Academic Affairs, and the university president, Harlan Hatcher. In June 1963, Taylor, Heyns, and Hatcher were invited, along with 174 other education leaders, by President John F. Kennedy to the White House, where they discussed creating more educational opportunities for African Americans.

=== Opportunity Awards Program (OAP) ===
The affirmative action admission policies at the university were first implemented in the fall of 1963 under the name Opportunity Awards Program (OAP), based on the assumption that the existing policies overlooked the academic potential of Black students, leading to lower enrollment of Black students at the university. A campus census conducted in 1964 revealed that there were 148 Black undergraduates and 25 Black graduates, comprising approximately 0.5 percent of the total student body. The primary goal of the program was to increase the admission of African American students.

The program placed heavy emphasis on high school counselor evaluations rather than relying on more consistent evaluations, such as GPA and standardized test scores. There was also an option that allowed students to interview with an admissions counselor. Once they were admitted through the program, they were granted scholarships that covered most of their expenses.

The affirmative action program was initially presented as a false flag to reduce resistance, claiming that the program accepted students of all races, but in fact, it mainly focused on those with a background of disadvantaged socio-economic status. Recruiters were sent to high schools that were predominantly Black. In the program's first year, 67 of the 70 scholars were Black. By the end of the decade, the university saw an increase in the Black community from 0.5 percent to 3 percent.

== Legal history ==
=== Federal court cases ===
==== Grutter v. Bollinger ====
Grutter v. Bollinger (2003) is a supreme court case in which The University of Michigan Law School denied entrance to Barbara Grutter, who was an student with a 3.8 GPA and a 161 LSAT score. She sued the university, and the then-president Lee Bollinger was the defendant. Grutter argued that she was discriminated against based on her race which would be violating the 14th Amendment and that she was rejected because the university used race as one of the factors in admissions. She also argued that the University of Michigan had no compelling interest in using race to grant admission to minority students. The University of Michigan Law School (Bollinger) disagreed and stated that there was a compelling state interest to use racial affirmative action to build a "critical mass" of minority students. In Justice Powell's diversity rationale, the Supreme Court stated "the student body diversity is a compelling state interest that can justify the use of race in university admission". They see this policy as a positive because it enhances diversity on campus and doesn't allow anyone to feel isolated on campus.

The court found that the University of Michigan's Law School's affirmative action admission policies were promoting diversity within its school. Sandra Day O'Connor wrote the 5–4 majority decision that the university's policies may have been in favor of underrepresented minority groups; however, this did not enforce a quota system that was declared unconstitutional in Regents of the University of California v. Bakke. She went on to discuss that in the future (around 25 years) this racial affirmative action plan would not be necessary, but for the time being it would be helpful in promoting diversity in the law school.

While Stevens, Souter, Ginsburg and Breyer concurred with O'Connor, Rehnquist, Kennedy, Scalia and Thomas dissented. The dissent argued that using race as a factor in admission decisions was in fact a way to promote a quota system and that it should be illegal now, not in 25 years to use racial affirmative action plans.

Before this case, the compelling interest required to justify affirmative action has been correcting the effects of historic discrimination.

After this case, Justice O'Connor held that the compelling interest at hand lay in "obtaining the educational benefits that flow from a diverse student body".

==== Gratz v. Bollinger ====
Gratz v. Bollinger (2003) is a case by the United States Supreme Court concerning two Caucasian students who applied to the University of Michigan for undergraduate admission but were denied admission on the basis of race. The case regarded the affirmative action policy in place for admissions at the University of Michigan, where on the basis of a points system to admission, minority students received additional points because of their race whereas white students did not. With a maximum of 150 attainable points, one would receive 20 extra points for being part of an underrepresented ethnicity group and would ultimately be granted admission if they met other basic requirements for admission.

According to John A. Payton, the attorney who spoke on behalf of the University of Michigan, the affirmative action policy was put in place in order to reach a "critical mass", or a certain number of individuals to the point where they feel comfortable acting as individuals. Payton argued that admitting a greater number of minority students would reduce stereotypes that may have been held by students and open a range of viewpoints and ideas for students that they wouldn't have had otherwise.

The admissions policy was ruled unconstitutional on the basis of violating the Equal Protection Clause of the 14th Amendment, Title VI, and 42 U.S.C § 1981.

==== Schuette v. Coalition to Defend Affirmative Action ====
In the 2014 case Schuette v. Coalition to Defend Affirmative Action, the Supreme Court ruled 6-2 that Michigan's constitutional amendment banning affirmative action was constitutional.

== Opinions ==
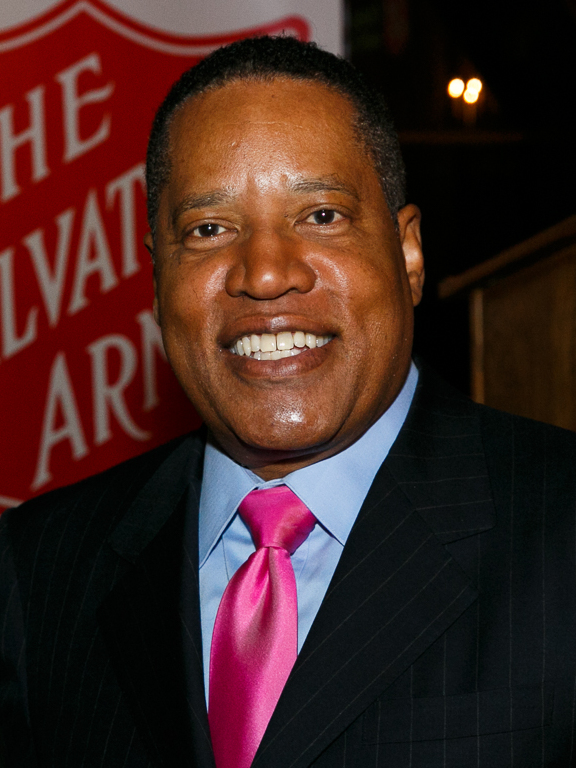
Larry Elder, a political commentator and graduate of the law school, vocally criticizes affirmative action policies. He argues that such measures represent government-sanctioned discrimination and believes that they imply a deficiency in certain minorities

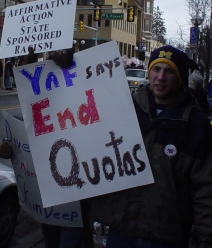
Members of the University of Michigan YAF Chapter protest affirmative action

=== University administration ===
==== Mark Schlissel ====
President Mark Schlissel, throughout his years at the university, has continued to affirm his commitment to diversity. In 2016, when the Supreme Court ruled in favor of affirmative action at the University of Texas at Austin, he released a statement in support of the ruling. In this statement, he highlighted the importance of diversity for universities to succeed. Following the 2006 court ruling, efforts made under Schlissel's administration have employed innovative alternatives to tackle diversity on campus.

=== Student groups ===
==== Black Student Union ====
In response to Michigan's court cases regarding affirmative action, the Black Student Union (BSU) launched a Twitter page to open a safe space to express their feeling of racial isolation. The Twitter hashtag, #BBUM (Being Black at the University of Michigan) was launched in November following the Supreme Court's arguments in the lawsuit relating to the Michigan's ban and the chaos that followed a Michigan fraternity's racist party invitation via Facebook. The tweets included input of daily experiences from an extensive array of black students attending the University of Michigan. "'#BBUM is NOT raising your hand in class because you do not want to be THAT black person who just doesn't get it ...' wrote one poster."

==== Students 4 Justice ====
The "Students 4 Justice" organized a petition with 835 signatures exacting outright support by President Schlissel primarily through university policies. Some of these demands included "Declar[ing] solidarity with us as black students and students of color...Create a permanent designated space on central campus for black students and students of color to organize, and do social justice work. This is not the same as Trotter Multicultural Center, because we want a space solely dedicated to community organizing and social justice work specifically for people of color."

==== United Coalition for Racial Justice ====
The United Coalition for Racial Justice (UCRJ) offered additional feedback to supplement the BSU's trending hashtag, #BBUM, regarding the university's demographics conflict. The group organized an expression of testimony, "Speak Out: 1,000 Strong for Racial Justice" which was attended by students, faculty, alumni and many others in support of the cause. The U-M American Culture online site discussed the protest by highlighting the focus to be, "low underrepresented minority enrollment and poor racial climate for students of color at the University of Michigan. While Provost Pollack's recent unveiling of new U-M diversity and inclusion initiatives represents an important step forward, we must continue to pursue student-led, direct civic engagement to hold the administration accountable. To avoid repeating past mistakes, we must ensure that these new initiatives are executed transparently, with direct student participation at every phase: that the administration not only welcome our voices, but our presences at the decision table." Following the demonstration, the university guaranteed to allocate 300,000 towards a multicultural center that would be located on their central campus.
