= Students for Fair Admissions =

Legal advocacy group

Students For Fair Admissions Inc
- Abbreviation: SFFA
- Formation: Tax-exempt since January 2015; 11 years ago
- Founder: Edward Blum
- Type: 501(c)(3)
- Purpose: "to support and participate in litigation that will restore the original principles of our nation’s civil rights movement"
- Headquarters: Arlington, Virginia
- Region served: United States
- President: Edward Blum
- Revenue: 4,962,419 USD (2024)
- Expenses: 4,412,679 USD (2024)
- Website: studentsforfairadmissions.org

Students for Fair Admissions (SFFA) is a nonprofit legal advocacy organization founded in 2014 by conservative activist Edward Blum for the purpose of challenging affirmative action admissions policies at schools. In June 2023, the Supreme Court ruled in Students for Fair Admissions v. Harvard that affirmative action programs in college admissions (excepting military academies) are unconstitutional.

== History ==
SFFA is an offshoot of the Project on Fair Representation. SFFA's federal lawsuits have targeted Harvard University and the University of North Carolina at Chapel Hill. Blum has set up websites to seek out plaintiffs.

== Lawsuits ==
Unlike the Fisher case, in which the plaintiff, Abigail Fisher, made herself public, the students rejected by Harvard and UNC have not revealed their identities because they want to shield themselves from potential retaliation.

Students for Fair Admissions v. President and Fellows of Harvard College was dismissed in October 2019, and that ruling was subsequently upheld on appeal. Following the death of Ruth Bader Ginsburg and her replacement with Amy Coney Barrett, however, SFFA petitioned the Supreme Court of the United States to review the case. In June 2023, the Supreme Court issued a landmark opinion that ruled affirmative action programs in college admissions unconstitutional.

In September 2023, the SFFA filed a lawsuit challenging the use of race and ethnicity as admissions factors at the United States Military Academy, as the Supreme Court exempted military academies from its ruling in Students for Fair Admissions v. Harvard. In February 2024, the organization's case against West Point Academy for considering race in admissions was denied certiorari upon appeal to the Supreme Court after losses in local courts. In August 2025, during the Second Trump presidency, the Justice Department "announced the settlement of litigation challenging former race-based admissions practices at the U.S. Military Academy at West Point and the U.S. Air Force Academy".

In December 2024, Judge Richard D. Bennett ruled that the United States Naval Academy was exempt from the decision and could use race in their admission decisions, citing "military cohesion and other national security factors". In June 2025, the Justice Department announced a filing to dismiss the lawsuit "based on the federal government’s commitments to end those practices permanently".

SFFA and Do No Harm sued the David Geffen School of Medicine at UCLA.

In June 2025, SFFA along with Tennessee Attorney General Jonathan Skrmetti filed a lawsuit against the United States Department of Education designating federal grant funding for Hispanic-Serving Institutions.

In 2025, the SFFA sued Kamehameha Schools, a private school established in 1887 from the bequest of Princess Pauahi Pākī for the education of Native Hawaiians, for its consideration of Native Hawaiian ancestry in its admissions policy.

== See also ==
- Fisher v. University of Texas I
- Fisher v. University of Texas II
- Students for Fair Admissions v. Harvard
- Students for Fair Admissions v. University of North Carolina
