= Patricia Gurin =

Social psychologist

- Born: 1932 (age 93–94)
- Education: Michigan (Ph.D.); Northwestern University
- Awards: APF Gold Medal Award for Life Achievement (2010); James S. Jackson Distinguished Career Award for Diversity Scholarship (2019)
- Scientific career
- Fields: Social psychology
- Workplaces: University of Michigan

Patricia Gurin is a social psychologist known for her work documenting the benefits of student and faculty diversity in higher education. She is the Nancy Cantor Distinguished University Professor Emerita of Psychology and Women's Studies at The University of Michigan.

Gurin provided testimony in the 2003 U.S. Supreme Court Affirmative Action case of Grutter v. Bollinger, involving the University of Michigan, which ultimately deemed the university's affirmative action policies to be constitutional. Gurin was honored by the American Psychological Foundation with the 2010 Gold Medal Award for Life Achievement. Her award citation stated, "Her development of a theoretical rationale for the educational benefits of diversity, and supporting empirical analysis, played a pivotal role in the University of Michigan’s legal defense of its admission policies."

== Biography ==
Gurin was born in 1932 and grew up in Vincennes, Indiana. She attended Northwestern University as an undergraduate, and subsequently attended graduate school at the University of Michigan where she obtained her PhD in social psychology.

Gurin took part in the March on Washington, August 28, 1963. She was married to Gerald Gurin for 54 years until his death in 2019; together they had two children. Early in her career, Gurin and her husband collaborated on research on Black youth that led to creation of the Program for Research on Black Americans at the University of Michigan in 1976.

Gurin has studied the benefits of diversity in higher education, arguing that a diverse educational setting benefits students by encouraging them to think in deeper, more complex ways. She has authored and edited several books including Hope and Independence: Blacks' Response to Electoral and Party Politics, Women, Politics and Change, and Defending Diversity: Affirmative Action at the University of Michigan.

The University of Michigan National Center for Institutional Diversity awarded Gurin the James S. Jackson Distinguished Career Award for Diversity Scholarship in 2019. The Patricia Gurin Certificate of Merit in Intergroup Relations is awarded annually to University of Michigan students who demonstrate academic excellence in the field of intergroup relations.

== Representative publications ==
- Gurin, P. (1999). Expert report of Patricia Gurin. Michigan Journal of Race and Law, 5(1), 363–425.
- Gurin, P. (1985). Women's gender consciousness. Public Opinion Quarterly, 49(2), 143–163.
- Gurin, P., Dey, E., Hurtado, S., & Gurin, G. (2002). Diversity and higher education: Theory and impact on educational outcomes. Harvard Educational Review, 72(3), 330–367.
- Gurin, P., Gurin, G., & Morrison, B. M. (1978). Personal and ideological aspects of internal and external control. Social Psychology, 41(4), 275–296.
- Gurin, P., Nagda, B. R. A., & Lopez, G. E. (2004). The benefits of diversity in education for democratic citizenship. Journal of Social Issues, 60(1), 17–34.
