= Wanda Denson-Low =

American business executive

- Born: Wanda K. Denson-Low; 1958 (age 67–68); St. Albans, Queens, New York City, U.S.
- Citizenship: American
- Education: Rensselaer Polytechnic Institute (BS, 1978); Brooklyn Law School (JD, 1981)
- Occupations: Business executive, lawyer
- Employers: Union Carbide; Hughes Aircraft; Boeing
- Known for: First minority woman to become patent counsel at a Fortune 500 company (1989)
- Board member of: Rensselaer Polytechnic Institute Board of Trustees (Vice Chair); Japanese American National Museum
- Awards: Pioneer Award, Black Engineer of the Year (2011); Organization of Chinese Americans National Asian Pacific American Corporate Achievement Award; NOW Legal Defense and Education Fund Award; Anti-Defamation League Deborah Award; National Asian Pacific American Bar Association Law Foundation Women Leadership Award (2004)

Wanda K. Denson-Low (born 1958) is the former senior vice president of the office of internal governance at The Boeing Company. In 1989, while working at Hughes Aircraft Company, she became the first minority woman to become a patent counsel at a Fortune 500 company. She serves as vice president of the Rensselaer Polytechnic Institute board of trustees.

== Early life and education ==
Denson-Low grew up in St. Albans, Queens. She is half Japanese and half African-American. She studied chemistry at Rensselaer Polytechnic Institute, graduating in 1978. She went on to earn her Juris Doctor at Brooklyn Law School in 1981.

== Career ==
Denson-Low practises law in California and Connecticut. She established the Wanda Denson Low and Ronald Low scholarship for outstanding members of the Asian Pacific American Community.

In 1981, Denson-Low began her tenure as a patent attorney at Union Carbide. Three years later, she became a trainee patent attorney in 1984. In 1985, she joined Hughes Aircraft Company as a senior lawyer, mentioring patent attorneys from minority groups. She became the nation's first minority women chief patent counsel for a Fortune 500 company in 1989. She managed a $14.4 million budget.

Denson-Low was the first minority woman to become vice president at Hughes Aircraft Company in 1992. She joined the Boeing legal team in October 2000. She was awarded a silver anniversary award from the Los Angeles Black Women Lawyer's Association for her services to the community.

She worked as vice president for Human Resources for the Defense and Space when Hughes Aircraft Company was acquired by Boeing in 2000. She was appointed Boeing's Vice President and Assistant General Counsel. Three years later, she was named Vice President of Integrated Defense Systems (IDS).

Denson-Low was appointed to the Boeing executive council in 2007. She was made Senior Vice President of the Office of Internal Governance in 2011.

== Retirement and board memberships ==
Denson-Low retired in 2014. She joined the Rensselaer Polytechnic Institute Board of Trustees in 2016. She has also served on the board of the Japanese American National Museum.

== Awards ==
- Pioneer Award from Black Engineer of the Year (2011)
- Organization of Chinese Americans National Asian Pacific American Corporate Achievement Award
- NOW Legal Defense and Education Fund Award
- Anti-Defamation League of Los Angeles Deborah Award
- National Asian Pacific American Bar Association Law Foundation Women Leadership Award (2004)
