= Students for Fair Admissions v. Harvard =

2022 United States Supreme Court case

Students for Fair Admissions v. Harvard Students for Fair Admissions v. University of North Carolina
- Supreme Court of the United States

Argued October 31, 2022 Decided June 29, 2023
- Full case name: Students for Fair Admissions, Inc. v. President and Fellows of Harvard College; Students for Fair Admissions v. University of North Carolina
- Docket nos.: 20-1199; 21–707
- Citations: 600 U.S. 181 (more)
- Argument: Oral argument
- Opinion announcement: Opinion announcement
- Decision: Opinion

Case history
- Prior: Judgment for Harvard, 397 F. Supp. 3d 126 (D. Mass. 2019); affirmed, 980 F.3d 157 (1st Cir. 2020); cert. granted, 142 S. Ct. 895 (2022)

Questions presented
- (1) Should this Court overrule Grutter v. Bollinger, and hold that institutions of higher education cannot use race as a factor in admissions; and (2) Title VI of the Civil Rights Act bans race-based admissions that, if done by a public university, would violate the Equal Protection Clause. Is Harvard violating Title VI by penalizing Asian-American applicants, engaging in racial balancing, overemphasizing race, and rejecting workable race-neutral alternatives?

Holding
- Harvard's and UNC's admissions program violate the Equal Protection Clause of the Fourteenth Amendment.

Court membership
- Chief Justice John Roberts Associate Justices Clarence Thomas · Samuel Alito; Sonia Sotomayor · Elena Kagan; Neil Gorsuch · Brett Kavanaugh; Amy Coney Barrett · Ketanji Brown Jackson

Case opinions
- Majority: Roberts, joined by Thomas, Alito, Gorsuch, Kavanaugh, Barrett
- Concurrence: Thomas
- Concurrence: Gorsuch, joined by Thomas
- Concurrence: Kavanaugh
- Dissent: Sotomayor, joined by Kagan; Jackson (as it applies to University of North Carolina)
- Dissent: Jackson (as it applies to University of North Carolina), joined by Sotomayor, Kagan
- Jackson (Note: While Jackson recused herself in Harvard, she participated in University of North Carolina and joined the dissent written by Sotomayor that was part of the combined slip opinion for both cases. She also wrote a separate dissent in University of North Carolina that Sotomayor and Kagan joined.) took no part in the consideration or decision of the case.

Laws applied
- U.S. Const. amend. XIV; Title VI of the Civil Rights Act of 1964

Students for Fair Admissions v. Harvard, 600 U.S. 181 (2023), is a landmark decision of the United States Supreme Court ruling that race-based affirmative action programs in most (Note: The court did not directly apply its ruling to military academies or to universities not accepting federal funds (use of federal funds would place them under the jurisdiction of the 14th amendment).) college admissions violate the Equal Protection Clause of the Fourteenth Amendment. With its companion case, Students for Fair Admissions v. University of North Carolina, the Supreme Court effectively overruled Grutter v. Bollinger (2003) and Regents of the University of California v. Bakke (1978), both of which validated some affirmative action in college admissions provided that race had a limited role in decisions. (Note: Chief Justice John Roberts's majority opinion does not state whether or not Grutter v. Bollinger was overturned. In his concurrence, Justice Clarence Thomas wrote that Grutter is, "for all intents and purposes, overruled.")

In 2014, Students for Fair Admissions (SFFA) sued Harvard University in U.S. District Court in Boston, alleging that the university's undergraduate admission practices violated Title VI of the Civil Rights Act of 1964 by discriminating against Asian Americans. In 2019, a district court judge upheld Harvard's limited use of race as a factor in admissions, citing lack of evidence of "discriminatory animus" or "conscious prejudice".

In 2020, the U.S. Court of Appeals for the First Circuit affirmed the district court's ruling. In 2021, SFFA petitioned the Supreme Court, which agreed to hear the case. After the appointment of Justice Ketanji Brown Jackson, a member of the Harvard Board of Overseers at the time, the cases were split, with Jackson recusing from the Harvard case while participating in the North Carolina one.

On June 29, 2023, the Supreme Court issued a decision in Harvard that, by a vote of 6–2, (Note: Justice Jackson recused from the Harvard case, but joined the dissent in the North Carolina case, making the latter 6–3 instead of 6–2.) reversed the lower court ruling. In the majority opinion, Chief Justice John Roberts held that affirmative action in college admissions is unconstitutional. Because of the absence of U.S. military academies in the cases, the lack of relevant lower court rulings, and the potentially distinct interests that the military academies may present, the Court, limited by Article III, did not decide the fate of race-based affirmative action in military academies.

== Background ==
The case's historical and legal background spans several decades, from the 1978 case Regents of the University of California v. Bakke, over the 2003 case Grutter v. Bollinger, to the 2016 case Fisher v. University of Texas. The Supreme Court ruled in Bakke, a landmark decision, that affirmative action could be used as a determining factor in college admission policy but that the University of California, Davis School of Medicine's racial quota was discriminatory. The Court upheld Bakke in Grutter v. Bollinger, another landmark decision. Concurrently, in Gratz v. Bollinger, the Court ruled that the points system the University of Michigan used to favor underrepresented minorities was unconstitutional. The Court vacated Fisher v. University of Texas (2013) (Note: Referred to as Fisher I to distinguish it from Fisher v. University of Texas (2016)) and upheld the lower court's decision to apply strict scrutiny to the University of Texas at Austin's race-conscious admissions policy in Fisher v. University of Texas (2016). (Note: Referred to as Fisher II to distinguish it from Fisher v. University of Texas (2013)) In Fisher II, strict scrutiny requires that the use of race serve a "compelling governmental interest"—like the educational benefits that stem from diversity—and be "narrowly tailored" to satisfy that interest. Institutions that receive federal funding, such as Harvard University, are subject to Title VI of the Civil Rights Act of 1964, which outlaws racial discrimination.

For years before 2023, some considered affirmative action in the U.S. a wedge issue among Asian Americans. It was contended that the practice drew criticism from white and Asian Americans, but support from African Americans, and mixed support among Hispanic and Latino Americans. In polling about affirmative action, answers varied depending on how the question was asked, suggesting ambivalence. There was a divide between Democrats and Republicans.

Opposition to affirmative action emerged in the neoconservative journal The Public Interest, particularly with editor Nathan Glazer's 1975 book Affirmative Discrimination: Ethnic Inequality and Public Policy. In the Roberts Court, Chief Justice John Roberts questioned the benefits of diversity in a physics class in Fisher II. Justices Clarence Thomas and Samuel Alito had opposed affirmative action; the remaining three conservative justices had no track record of opposing affirmative action before the ruling, although a 1999 article Justice Brett Kavanaugh wrote in The Wall Street Journal signaled he would end it. Justice Sotomayor had repeatedly and proudly said she was a "product of affirmative action" and defended affirmative action in previous cases before the Court.

== District Court case ==
=== Lawsuit ===
On November 17, 2014, SFFA, representing a group of anonymous Asian American plaintiffs Harvard University had rejected, sued the school in federal district court. The suit claimed that Asians were being discriminated against in favor of whites. SFFA was founded by conservative legal strategist Edward Blum, who also founded the Project on Fair Representation, with a goal to end racial classifications in education, voting procedures, legislative redistricting, and employment. Blum participated in cases such as Bush v. Vera, Shelby County v. Holder, and Fisher v. University of Texas. SFFA's case was the first high-profile case on behalf of plaintiffs who were not white, and who had academic credentials that, according to Vox, were "much harder to criticize". SFFA's lawyers said that the initial hearing focused on discrimination against Asian American applicants, not affirmative action in general.

Certain Asian American advocacy groups filed amicus briefs in support of SFFA, believing that they or their children had been discriminated against in college admissions. Other Asian American advocacy groups filed amicus briefs in support of Harvard. On May 15, 2015, a coalition of more than 60 Asian American organizations filed federal complaints against Harvard with the United States Department of Education and Department of Justice. The coalition asked for a civil rights investigation into what it called Harvard's discriminatory admission practices against Asian American applicants. The complaints at the Department of Education were dismissed in July 2015 because Students for Fair Admissions (SFFA) had already filed a lawsuit making similar allegations in November 2014.

But in 2017, the coalition resubmitted their complaints to the Department of Justice under the Trump administration. It opened an investigation into allegations against Harvard's policies, and that investigation was ongoing as of February 2020.

=== Plaintiff allegations ===
In the lawsuit, the plaintiffs claimed that Harvard imposed a soft quota of "racial balancing" that artificially depressed the number of Asian American applicants it admitted. The plaintiffs maintained that the proportion of Asians Harvard admitted was suspiciously similar year after year despite dramatic increases in the number of Asian American applicants, as well as the size of the Asian American population.

During the lawsuit, the plaintiffs gained access to Harvard's individualized admissions files from 2014 to 2019 and aggregate data from 2000 to 2019. The plaintiffs also interviewed and deposed numerous Harvard officials. From these sources, the plaintiffs alleged that Harvard admissions officers consistently rated Asian American applicants, as a group, lower than others on "positive personality traits" such as likability, courage, and kindness. The plaintiffs alleged that Asian Americans scored higher than any other racial or ethnic group on other admissions measures like test scores, grades, and extracurricular activities, but the students' personal ratings significantly hampered their admissions chances. The plaintiffs also claimed that alumni interviewers (who, unlike admissions officers within Harvard, actually met the applicants) gave Asian Americans personal ratings comparable to white applicants'. Harvard's admissions staff testified that they did not believe that different racial groups have better personal qualities than others, but nevertheless, Asian applicants as a racial group received consistently weaker personal scores over the period surveyed, and Harvard's admissions office rated Asian Americans with the worst personal qualities of any racial group. African-Americans, on the other hand, consistently scored the lowest on the academic rating but highest on the personal rating, allegedly displaying more "likability, courage, and kindness" than other racial groups.

Peter Arcidiacono, a Duke University economist testifying on the plaintiffs' behalf, concluded that Asian American applicants as a group performed stronger on measures of academic achievement (which he measured using their SAT and ACT scores) and extracurricular activities but received a statistically significant penalty relative to white applicants in Harvard's "Personal Rating" and "Overall Rating" scores. As a result, the plaintiffs alleged Asian American applicants had the lowest chance of admission of all racial groups, despite scoring highest in all objective measurements. Arcidiacono testified that removing Asian applicants' personal score penalty relative to white applicants would result in a 16% increase in the number of admitted Asian Americans.

Arcidiacono suggested that the applicant's race played a significant role in admissions. According to his testimony, if an Asian American applicant with certain characteristics (like scores, GPAs, and extracurricular activities, family background) had a 25% statistical likelihood of admission, the same applicant, if white, would have a 36% likelihood. Hispanic and Black applicants with the same characteristics would have a 77% and 95% predicted chance of admission, respectively.

Arcidiacono's report also alleged that Harvard's preferential treatment of African-American and Hispanic applicants was not due to its efforts to achieve socioeconomic diversity in its student body, since "Harvard admits more than twice as many non-disadvantaged African-American applicants than disadvantaged African-American applicants". He also argued that if Harvard removed all other factors for admissions preference—racial preferences for underrepresented minorities, penalties against Asian Americans, and legacy and athlete preferences—the number of Asian-Americans admitted would increase by 1,241, or 50%, over six years.

The plaintiffs also claimed that, in 2013, Harvard's Office of Institutional Research found a statistically significant penalty against Asian American applicants in an internal investigation, but had never made the findings public or acted on them. Plaintiffs and commentators compared the treatment of Asians to the early-20th-century Jewish quota, which used immigrant Jews' allegedly "deficient" one-dimensional personalities and lack of leadership traits to justify excluding non-legacy Jews at elite universities, including Harvard.

=== Defendant responses ===
Harvard denied engaging in discrimination and said its admissions philosophy of considering race as one of many factors in its admissions complied with the law. The school also said that it received more than 40,000 applications, that a large majority of applicants are academically qualified, and as a result, it must consider more than grades and test scores to determine admission for its 2,000 available slots. Harvard said its personal rating reflected "a wide range of valuable information in the application, such as an applicant's personal essays, responses to short answer questions, recommendations from teachers and guidance counselors, alumni interview reports, staff interviews, and any additional letters or information provided by the applicant".

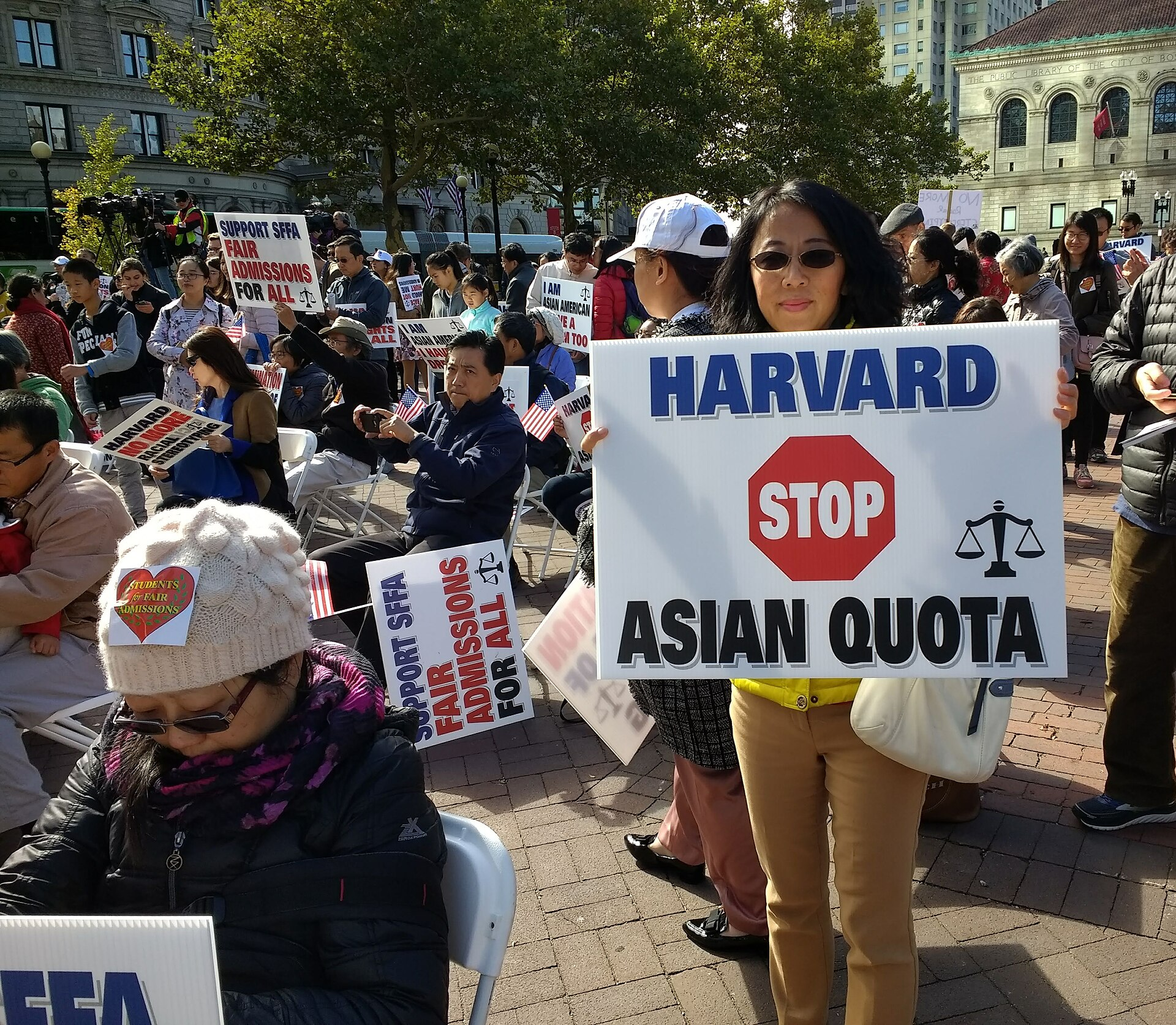
Students protesting at Copley Square in support of the lawsuit on October 14, 2018

The school said the proportion of admitted Asian American students had grown from 17% to 21% in a decade, while Asian Americans represent around 6% of the U.S. population. It said it had studied more than a dozen race-neutral admissions alternatives and found that none promoted "Harvard's diversity-related educational objectives as well as Harvard's ... admissions program while also maintaining the standards of excellence that Harvard seeks in its student body".

Using the same data given to the plaintiffs, UC Berkeley economist David Card testified on Harvard's behalf and wrote in a report that SFFA's analysis of the personal ratings excluded applications from a sizable proportion of the applicant pool, personal essays, and letters of recommendation from teachers and guidance counselors, and that there was no statistically significant difference in personal scores compared to white students. Card argued that if SFFA's analysis showed that the personal ratings assigned to Asian Americans were unexpectedly poorer, Asian Americans also unexpectedly scored higher on the academic rating than other racial groups, which would add complexity to the claim that Harvard was intentionally discriminating against Asian Americans. In response to Arcidiacono's analysis, Harvard contended that Arcidiacono had "mined the data to his advantage" by excluding applicants who received preferable treatment due to being legacies, athletes, or the children of staff and faculty, including Asian-Americans. Harvard also argued that the documents the plaintiffs alleged showed discrimination against Asian Americans represented "a preliminary and incomplete analysis" that Harvard's Office of Institutional Research (OIR) conducted "without the benefit of the full admissions database or a full understanding of the admissions process" and that the "OIR documents themselves directly acknowledge various missing data and aspects of the admissions process that are not taken into account".

Various students, alumni, and external groups filed amici briefs on both sides.

=== Lower courts ===
In 2013, SFFA sued Harvard in U.S. District Court in Boston, arguing that its admission practices were unconstitutional. In 2019, a district court judge upheld Harvard's limited use of race as a factor in admissions, finding that SFFA had provided no evidence that Asian Americans, or any other racial groups, had been harmed by it. In 2020, the U.S. Court of Appeals for the First Circuit affirmed the district court's ruling. In 2021, SFFA petitioned the Supreme Court, which agreed to hear the case.

In October 2019, Judge Allison D. Burroughs ruled that Harvard College's admissions policies did not unduly discriminate against Asian Americans. While the system was "not perfect", Burroughs ruled, it nonetheless passed constitutional muster. In her ruling, Burroughs wrote that there were "no quotas" in place at Harvard, despite acknowledging that the school attempted to reach the same level of racial diversity each year and used "the racial makeup of admitted students to help determine how many students it should admit overall".

In February 2020, SFFA appealed to the United States Court of Appeals for the First Circuit. The court heard oral arguments in mid-2020 and in late 2020 ruled in Harvard's favor, concluding that Burroughs had not erred in her ruling and major factual findings. The Justice Department filed friend-of-the-court briefs in both the initial hearing and the appeal, arguing that Harvard imposed "a racial penalty by systematically disfavoring Asian American applicants".

== Supreme Court ==
SFFA petitioned the Supreme Court to review both the First Circuit's decision in the Harvard case, which focused on the impact of the admissions process on Asian Americans, and a similar decision from the Middle District of North Carolina, Students for Fair Admissions v. University of NC, et al., which focused on the impact on both white and Asian American applicants at the University of North Carolina and which had been decided in the school's favor in 2021. Both petitions sought the court to overturn Grutter v. Bollinger. In Harvard, SFFA asked whether Harvard's admission practices violated Title VI of the Civil Rights Act given possible race-neutral selection processes, while in North Carolina, it asked whether a university can reject a race-neutral admission process if it believes it needs to protect the student body's diversity and quality of education.

Harvard filed an opposing brief seeking to have the Supreme Court reject SFFA's petition. In June 2021, the Court requested that the U.S. government submit a brief of its stance on the case, and in December the Solicitor General of the United States under the Biden administration urged the Supreme Court to reject the appeal.

The Supreme Court agreed to review both cases on January 24, 2022, and consolidated them under Harvard. After Ketanji Brown Jackson testified during her confirmation hearing that she would recuse herself from the case because she is on the Harvard Board of Overseers, the Supreme Court separated the two cases, allowing her to participate in the UNC case. Both cases were argued on October 31, 2022.

=== Amicus briefs ===
The Court received 33 amicus briefs in support of SFFA and 60 in support of Harvard and UNC.

Among those in support of SFFA, 14 senators and 68 representatives, as well as 19 states, wrote that Grutter was inconsistent with the Equal Protection Clause. Others wrote that Harvard's and the University of North Carolina's admission policies were discriminatory because any favoritism toward one race resulted in discrimination against others. Other SFFA-supporting briefs, including those by the Cato Institute and the Pacific Legal Foundation, argued that affirmative action policies are generally arbitrary, do not enhance diversity on campuses, and violate the allowance for federal funding under Title VI.

In support of the universities, both the Biden administration and several current and former senators wrote that historically, both the legislative and executive branches used affirmative action to combat racial imbalances and did not intend to violate Title VI. Sixty-five senators and representatives wrote that despite Brown and Grutter, segregation at K–12 schools continued to worsen, and affirmative action was needed to fight racial imbalance. Several groups, including the American Bar Association, the American Psychological Association, and the American Civil Liberties Union, argued that racial diversity is essential in college and beyond.

Several other Asian American groups submitted amicus briefs in support of race-conscious admissions policies and Harvard. They included the Asian American Legal Defense and Education Fund, representing itself and 44 other Asian American groups and higher education faculty, and Asian Americans Advancing Justice - Los Angeles, representing several Asian American students. The NAACP Legal Defense and Education Fund filed a brief in support of Harvard, representing 25 Harvard student and alumni organizations consisting of "thousands of Asian American, Black, Latino, Native American, and white students and alumni".

=== Opinions ===
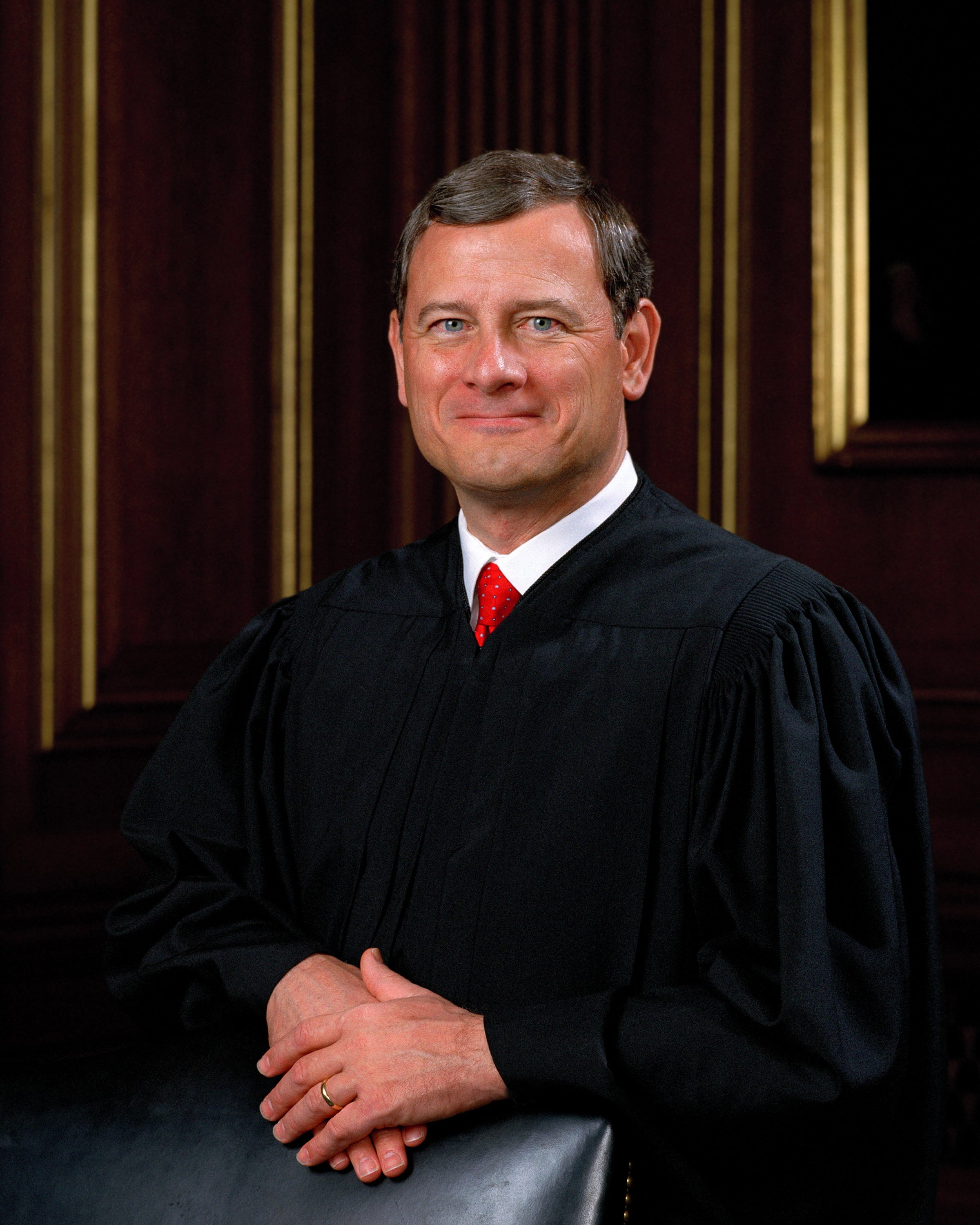
Chief Justice Roberts delivered the opinion of the Court.

Harvard and North Carolina were decided jointly on June 29, 2023, with the Court ruling that race-based admissions adopted by both Harvard University and UNC were unconstitutional under the Equal Protection Clause of the Fourteenth Amendment. Jackson recused herself in Harvard, resulting in a 6–2 vote, and dissented in North Carolina, resulting in a 6–3 vote there. The majority opinion, by Roberts, stated that the use of race was not a compelling interest, and the means by which the schools attempted to achieve diversity (tracking bare racial statistics) bore little or no relationship to the purported goals (viewpoint and intellectual diversity and developing a diverse future leadership). But Roberts said that prohibiting the use of race in admissions did not stop universities from considering a student's discussion of how their race had affected their life "so long as that discussion is concretely tied to a quality of character or unique ability that the particular applicant can contribute to the university".

In an unusual move, both Thomas and Sotomayor read parts of their opinions from the bench as part of the announcement of the decision. Thomas's reading of his concurrence was the first time any justice had read a concurring opinion from the bench in almost 10 years.

==== Majority opinion ====
In the majority opinion, Roberts wrote that the Fourteenth Amendment's Equal Protection Clause applies "without regard to any difference of race, of color, or of nationality" and thus must apply to every person. Roberts argued that universities had not prioritized individual experiences in their admissions processes, writing: "Many universities have for far too long done just the opposite. And in doing so, they have concluded, wrongly that the touchstone of an individual's identity is not challenges bested, skills built, or lessons learned but the color of their skin. Our Constitutional history does not tolerate that choice." Writing that affirmative action policies "fly in the face of our colorblind Constitution", Roberts referenced the legal principle of Constitutional colorblindness. He wrote, "Eliminating racial discrimination means eliminating all of it", adding, "For '[t]he guarantee of equal protection cannot mean one thing when applied to one individual and something else when applied to a person of another color.' " Roberts wrote that the admissions programs "lack sufficiently focused and measurable objectives warranting the use of race, unavoidably employ race in a negative manner, involve racial stereotyping, and lack meaningful end points. We have never permitted admissions programs to work in that way, and we will not do so today".

==== Concurrences ====
Justices Thomas, Gorsuch, and Kavanaugh each submitted a concurring opinion. In his concurrence, Thomas laid out an originalist argument for the "colorblind constitution" and cited statistics that indicate race-conscious admissions to universities come at the expense of a student's individual value. Thomas also wrote:

While I am painfully aware of the social and economic ravages which have befallen my race and all who suffer discrimination, I hold out enduring hope that this country will live up to its principles so clearly enunciated in the Declaration of Independence and the Constitution of the United States: that all men are created equal, are equal citizens, and must be treated equally before the law.

Although Gorsuch joined the majority opinion, his concurrence emphasized that Title VI of the Civil Rights Act bars affirmative action. That statute barred discrimination "on the ground of" race, so Gorsuch reasoned that affirmative action was forbidden by statute regardless of any constitutional arguments.

==== Dissents ====
In a dissenting opinion joined by Kagan and Jackson, Sotomayor wrote: "Ignoring race will not equalize a society that is racially unequal. What was true in the 1860s, and again in 1954, is true today: Equality requires acknowledgment of inequality." She wrote that the majority opinion's "interpretation of the Fourteenth Amendment is not only contrary to precedent and the entire teachings of our history ... but is also grounded in the illusion that racial inequality was a problem of a different generation." Sotomayor also drew on the framework of diversity, equity, and inclusion, writing, "The result of today's (June 2023) decision is that a person's skin color may play a role in assessing individualized suspicion, but it cannot play a role in assessing that person's individualized contributions to a diverse learning environment."

In a separate dissenting opinion, Jackson wrote:

With let-them-eat-cake obliviousness, today, the majority pulls the ripcord and announces "colorblindness for all" by legal fiat. But deeming race irrelevant in law does not make it so in life...It would be deeply unfortunate if the Equal Protection Clause actually demanded this perverse, ahistorical, and counterproductive outcome. To impose this result in that Clause's name when it requires no such thing, and to thereby obstruct our collective progress toward the full realization of the Clause's promise, is truly a tragedy for all of us.

Jackson's dissent was criticized for claiming that "for high-risk Black newborns, having a Black physician more than doubles the likelihood that the baby will live, and not die." Jackson based this claim on an amicus brief that misrepresented the findings of a study examining mortality rates in Florida newborns between 1992 and 2015.

== Reaction ==
=== Political ===
==== Support ====
Then-former President Donald Trump said at the time, "This is a great day for America. People with extraordinary ability and everything else necessary for success, including future greatness for our country, are finally being rewarded. This is the ruling everyone was waiting and hoping for." Former vice president Mike Pence said, "There is no place for discrimination based on race in the United States, and I am pleased that the Supreme Court has put an end to this egregious violation of civil and constitutional rights in admissions processes, which only served to perpetuate racism."

The U.S. Department of Justice wrote that Harvard must provide school admission documents for federal review and adhere to the Court's decision: "Providing requested data is a basic expectation of any credible compliance process, and refusal to cooperate creates concerns about university practices. If Harvard has stopped discriminating, it should happily share the data necessary to prove it."

Harvard continues to fight the Trump administration over disclosing students' personal information. Trump wrote, "We are now seeking One Billion Dollars in damages, and want nothing further to do, into the future, with Harvard University".

Florida Governor and 2024 presidential candidate Ron DeSantis said, "College admissions should be based on merit and applicants should not be judged on their race or ethnicity. The Supreme Court has correctly upheld the Constitution and ended discrimination by colleges and universities." 2024 presidential candidate Vivek Ramaswamy wrote, "affirmative action is a badly failed experiment: time to put a nail in the coffin & restore colorblind meritocracy."

Republican Senators Mitch McConnell, Tom Cotton, Tim Scott, and Marsha Blackburn each voiced their support for the decision.

==== Opposition ====
President Biden delivers remarks following Students for Fair Admissions v. Harvard.

Andrea Campbell, the attorney general of Massachusetts, reacts to the decision.

In a speech, President Joe Biden said, "This is not a normal court" and that the United States needed "a new path forward that is consistent with the law."

Senate Majority leader Chuck Schumer said, "The Supreme Court ruling has put a giant roadblock in our country's march toward racial justice." Other Congressional Democrats, such as Senator Cory Booker, House Minority leader Hakeem Jeffries, and Congressman Hank Johnson, voiced their disagreement with the decision.

Former president Barack Obama said, "Like any policy, affirmative action wasn't perfect. But it allowed generations of students like Michelle and me to prove we belonged. Now it's up to all of us to give young people the opportunities they deserve—and help students everywhere benefit from new perspectives." Former First Lady Michelle Obama said, "My heart breaks for any young person out there who's wondering what their future holds—and what kinds of chances will be open to them."

=== Civil rights ===
NAACP President and CEO Derrick Johnson said, "affirmative action exists because we cannot rely on colleges, universities, and employers to enact admissions and hiring practices that embrace diversity, equity and inclusion" and "Race plays an undeniable role in shaping the identities of and quality of life for Black Americans. In a society still scarred by the wounds of racial disparities, the Supreme Court has displayed a willful ignorance of our reality."

Lawyers' Committee for Civil Rights Under Law President and Executive Director Damon Hewitt said: "No matter what this court says, we will continue to fight. No matter what this court says, nothing can deprive us of what we call a race conscious future. The future that we deserve, the future that students deserve. Because affirmative action and holistic admissions is not a handout. It's not even really a hand up. It is what students deserve when they bring their whole selves to the table".

Students for Fair Admissions founder Edward Blum called the ruling "the beginning of the restoration of the colorblind legal covenant that binds together our multi-racial, multi-ethnic nation", adding, "These discriminatory admission practices undermined the integrity of our country's civil rights laws".

=== Universities ===
University of California President Michael V. Drake said in a statement that the ruling ended a "valuable practice that has helped higher education institutions increase diversity and address historical wrongs over the past several decades". University of Southern California president Carol Folt said "we will not go backward" and "This decision will not impact our commitment to creating a campus that is welcoming, diverse, and inclusive to talented individuals from every background". Johns Hopkins University President Ron Daniels called the court's ruling a "significant setback in our efforts to build a university community that represents the rich diversity of America". Rice University officials called the ruling "disappointing".

Columbia University spokesperson Ben Chang said, "Diversity is a positive force across every dimension of Columbia, and we can and must find a durable and meaningful path to preserve it". The University of Pennsylvania said, "In full compliance with the Supreme Court's decision, we will seek ways to admit individual students who will contribute to the kind of exceptional community that is essential to Penn's educational mission".

Rutgers Law School Vice Dean Stacy Hawkins said that despite the ruling, colleges and universities can continue to employ "race-neutral" means to promote diversity, such as increased consideration of socioeconomic status and targeting certain schools for recruitment, both of which are said to correlate with race and ethnicity. Institutions in California and Florida have already adopted similar methods, because they are not allowed to consider race and ethnicity under state law.

Harvard reportedly gave the Trump administration 2,300 pages of documents in response to a request, but not its students' personal information. Harvard wrote: "The University will continue to defend itself against these retaliatory actions which have been initiated simply because Harvard refused to surrender its independence or relinquish its constitutional rights in response to unlawful government overreach".

Attorney General Merrick Garland wrote in a statement: "the Department of Justice remains committed to promoting student diversity in higher education using all available legal tools. In the coming weeks, we will work with the Department of Education to provide resources to college and universities on what admissions practices and programs remain lawful following the Court's decision."

Michael Wang, whom USA Today called "a poster child for the anti-affirmative action movement" who had filed discrimination complaints against three universities with the Department of Education's Office for Civil Rights in 2013 and met with SFFA's founder, later said, "a part of me regrets what I've put forward". Wang clarified that he did not regret filing his three original complaints and that while he was not "anti-affirmative action", he supported reforming it.

America First Legal, a conservative litigation outfit headed by Trump adviser Stephen Miller, sent letters to more than 200 U.S. law schools within days of the Court's ruling threatening them with lawsuits unless they immediately terminated all race and sex preferences in student admissions, faculty hiring, and law-review membership or article selection.

A 2023 Pew Research Center poll found that most Americans disapproved of the use of race and ethnicity in college admissions.

== Impact ==
=== College admissions ===
Outgoing president of Harvard University Lawrence Bacow said that Harvard would comply with the law but remained steadfast in its belief that "deep and transformative teaching, learning, and research depend upon a community comprising people of many backgrounds, perspectives, and lived experiences". The University of North Carolina also said it would comply with the law but was disappointed by the decision.

In August 2024, MIT was the first major private college to release data on the ethnic makeup of its new freshman class. It showed a drop-off in Black and Latino students, while Asians made a significant gain.

Racial composition of MIT's freshman class
Race	Class of 2027 (Pre SFFA v Harvard)	Class of 2028 (Post SFFA v Harvard)
White	38%	37%
Asian	40%	47%
Black	15%	5%
Hispanic	16%	11%
Total	109% (Note: Includes students identifying with multiple races)	100% (Note: Excludes students identifying with multiple races)

Class of 2027-28 freshman racial changes
Race	White	Black	Asian	Latino
Yale	4%	0%	-6%	1%
Dartmouth	4%	1%	1%	-3%
Princeton		0	2	-1%
Brown	-3%	-6%	4%	-4%
Cornell	-1%	4%	2%	-6%
Harvard		-4%	0%	2%
Columbia		-8%	9%	-3%

In September 2024, Harvard University released data on the ethnic makeup of its class of 2028, showing a 4% decrease in Black enrollment, a 2% increase in Hispanic or Latino enrollment, and no change in Asian American enrollment compared to the class of 2027. Notably, the College did not provide a figure for students who identified as white and reported that 8% of class members did not report a race or identity, twice the previous year's percentage.

For the same freshman class, other major universities saw mixed results. At Columbia, "The share of Black or African American students also sank [...] from 20 percent last year to 12 percent this fall. The number of Latino and Hispanic students declined from 22 percent to 19 percent this year, while those identifying as Asian American or Pacific Islander rose from 30 percent to 39 percent." At Brown, the percentage of students identifying as non-Hispanic white decreased from 46 to 43 percent, as Asian increased from 29 to 33 percent, Hispanic or Latino decreased from 14 to 10 percent, non-Hispanic Black or African American decreased from 15 to 9 percent, and American Indian or Alaska Native decreased from 2 to 1.5 percent. Further, the percentage of students who did not report their race increased from 4 to 7 percent. At Yale, Asian enrollment dropped by six percentage points, Black and Native American enrollment remained stable, white enrollment increased by four percentage points, and Latino enrollment increased by one percentage point. At Princeton, Asian enrollment dropped by 2.2 percentage points. At the same time, Hispanic and Latino enrollment dropped one percentage point and Black enrollment shifted by less than one percent. Some experts say "it may take years to see the definitive impact of the decision."

Compared to the class of 2028, the admissions data released by Harvard for the class of 2029 show a decrease in Black enrollment from 14 to 11.5 percent and Hispanic enrollment from 16 to 11 percent, while Asian American enrollment increased from 37 to 41 percent.

Some universities had established programs before the Supreme Court decision that were designed to mitigate the effects of earlier similar state laws eliminating DEI considerations in college admissions. On September 14, 2023, Colorado College implemented an initiative called the Healing and Affirming Village and Empowerment Network (HAVEN). Under HAVEN, the college helps students from Florida, Texas, North Carolina, or North Dakota for two academic years with financial aid, housing, transferable coursework, counseling, and campus resources. Vice President for Enrollment Mark Hatch said, "We are excited to launch this new program as the college deepens our commitment to anti-racism. As our staff in admission and financial aid seek to enroll a talented and diverse student body, our faculty, staff, and students remain passionate about creating a more welcoming and inclusive environment for the entire Colorado College community".

On October 3, 2024, Colorado College received a Higher Education Excellence in Diversity (HEED) Award. The award is given to a higher education institution that demonstrates "outstanding commitment to diversity, equity, and inclusion".

=== Corporate diversity programs ===
Will Hild, director of the conservative advocacy group Consumers' Research said that Students for Fair Admissions v. Harvard puts a "wind in the sail" of groups that seek to end diversity, equity, and inclusion programs. Although the case regards education, employers may reassess their policies, according to former Equal Employment Opportunity Commission lawyer Stephen Paskoff.

As of January 2025, Walmart, John Deere, Harley-Davidson, McDonald's, Meta and Amazon stated their intention to end DEI initiatives at their companies following the Supreme Court ruling. Other companies, such as Costco and Apple, affirmed their support for ongoing DEI programs when challenged by shareholders.

=== Military academies ===
After Students for Fair Admission v. Harvard, several lower courts declined to extend the ruling to military academies, instead holding that military academies, including the U.S. Military Academy and the U.S. Naval Academy, may continue to consider race in admissions because of the compelling national security interest in a diverse officer corps. But in April 2025, U.S. military academies ended affirmative action in admissions anyway.

=== Lawsuits after Students for Fair Admission v. Harvard ===
Since the Supreme Court's decision in Harvard, conservative groups such as Blum's American Alliance for Equal Rights have sued public and private companies, nonprofit groups, and other entities that give minorities any type of benefit. The suits are based on the Supreme Court's decision; the Ku Klux Klan Act of 1871, which forbids engaging in conspiracies to deny civil rights; and the Civil Rights Act of 1866, which these groups argue protect white people from discrimination. The groups also cite executive orders Trump issued in his second term that aim to eliminate diversity, equity, and inclusion initiatives in government.

After Students for Fair Admission v. Harvard, SFFA sent 150 colleges and universities letters saying it would continue to monitor changes in their admissions procedures.

On the day of the decision, Missouri Attorney General Andrew Bailey ordered Missouri's public universities to stop considering race as a factor in scholarship decisions. In May 2024, the University of Missouri filed a court petition requesting the authority to override previous donor agreements.

In February 2025, Students Against Racial Discrimination sued the nine-campus University of California system in the U.S. District Court for the Northern District of California, alleging that its use of a "holistic" admissions policy violates Title VI of the Civil Rights Act and the Equal Protection Clause of the Fourteenth Amendment in light of Students for Fair Admission v. Harvard.

In March 2025, Stanley Zhong and Students Who Oppose Racial Discrimination sued Cornell University in the U.S. District Court for the Northern District of New York, alleging discrimination against Asian applicants in its admissions process in violation of Title VI of the Civil Rights Act of 1964. Zhong had previously sued the University of California for racial discrimination in admissions. He was reportedly rejected by 16 of the 18 colleges he applied to, with a 3.97 GPA, before Google hired him at age 18 in 2023.

The Court's decision and the 2026 Harvard lawsuit have concerned K-12 schools with regard to their curricula and hiring practices. Cardinal Education in the Bay Area CEO Allen Koh said: "I think schools that have better resources—they're going to be able to produce literature and have workshops [for students on college admissions], and maybe help them navigate some of these issues. But not every school will be able to do that."

== See also ==
- List of landmark court decisions in the United States
  - Schuette v. Coalition to Defend Affirmative Action (572 U.S. 291, 2014)
- Discrimination of excellence
- Ending Radical and Wasteful Government DEI Programs and Preferencing (14151, 2025)
- Merit, excellence, and intelligence (MEI) – framework that emphasizes selecting candidates based solely on their merit, achievements, skills, abilities, intelligence, and contributions
- Florida Senate Bill 266 (HB 999, 2023)
