= Rya W. Zobel =

German-American judge (1931–2026)

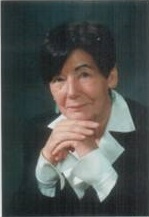
- Zobel, c. 1990

Senior Judge of the United States District Court for the District of Massachusetts
- In office April 1, 2014 – July 4, 2026

Judge of the United States District Court for the District of Massachusetts
- In office March 23, 1979 – April 1, 2014
- Appointed by: Jimmy Carter
- Preceded by: Seat established by 92 Stat. 1629
- Succeeded by: Allison D. Burroughs

Personal details
- Born: December 18, 1931 Zwickau, Saxony, Germany
- Died: July 4, 2026 (aged 94)
- Education: Radcliffe College (BA); Harvard University (LLB)

Rya Weickert Zobel (December 18, 1931 – July 4, 2026) was a United States District Court Judge of the United States District Court for the District of Massachusetts. She was one of the first women to become a federal judge and one of the first women to attend Harvard Law School.

== Childhood in Nazi Germany ==
Zobel was born in Zwickau, Germany, on December 18, 1931, to a Jewish mother and a non-Jewish father. She grew up in Nazi Germany amid the devastation of World War II. She survived relentless bombings, food shortages, instability, and displacement, which interrupted her education for several years and fractured her family.

At the end of the war, when Zobel was 13 years old, her parents were accused of being American spies and sent to Soviet prison camps. She did not see her mother for 10 years, and never saw her father again, who is believed to have killed himself in prison. Zobel and her younger brother were effectively orphaned, and she became his primary caretaker. The siblings escaped war-torn Germany and made their way to the United States as refugees.

== Education and career ==
After moving in with her aunt and uncle on Long Island, Zobel began high school in the U.S. She did not know much English and had missed three years of school because of the war, but still did well academically. She was accepted to Radcliffe College, Harvard's sister college, where she graduated cum laude in 1953.

Zobel was one of the first women to attend Harvard Law School, earning her law degree 1956. She had difficulty finding a job because most law firms did not want to hire a woman. For that reason, she spent nine years working as a law clerk for George Clinton Sweeney, then the Chief Judge of the U.S. District Court for the District of Massachusetts, from 1956 to 1966. Afterwards, she worked in private practice in Boston, Massachusetts for several years, from 1967 to 1979. She was the first woman to become a partner at the law firm Goodwin, Procter & Hoar, now known as Goodwin Procter.

== Federal judicial service ==
On January 25, 1979, Zobel was nominated by President Jimmy Carter to a new seat on the United States District Court for the District of Massachusetts created by 92 Stat. 1629. She was confirmed by the United States Senate on March 21, 1979, and received her commission on March 23, 1979.

Among her judicial duties, she was director of the Federal Judicial Center from 1995 to 1999. She assumed senior status on April 1, 2014. Zobel served as a judge in the 2019 college admissions bribery scandal case.

In 2020, she received the Edward J. Devitt Distinguished Service to Justice Award, the highest honor bestowed upon an Article III federal judge in the United States.

In 2021, she was a recipient of the Outstanding Americans by Choice award from U.S. Citizenship and Immigration Services. The award recognizes the outstanding achievements of naturalized U.S. citizens.

== Death ==
Zobel died on July 4, 2026, at the age of 94.

== See also ==
- List of United States federal judges by longevity of service

== Sources ==
Legal offices
Preceded by Seat established by 92 Stat. 1629	Judge of the United States District Court for the District of Massachusetts; 1979–2014	Succeeded by Allison D. Burroughs
