= Asian American Legal Defense and Education Fund =

US non-profit organization

- Type: Non-profit
- Industry: Civil rights
- Founded: 1974; 52 years ago
- Headquarters: New York, New York
- Number of employees: 14
- Website: aaldef.org

The Asian American Legal Defense and Education Fund (AALDEF) is a New York–based national organization founded in 1974 that seeks to protect and promote the civil rights of Asian Americans. By combining litigation, advocacy, education, and organizing, AALDEF works with Asian American communities across the country to secure human rights for all.

== History ==
In 1974, a small group of lawyers, activists, and students in Lower Manhattan came together to create a new organization focused on the legal needs of the Asian American community. AALDEF was the first nonprofit organization on the East Coast to focus specifically on defending the civil rights of the Asian American community.

=== The 1970s ===
Some early AALDEF advocacy efforts included: calling for the hiring of Chinese American construction workers at Confucius Plaza in Manhattan's Chinatown and mounting a campaign to stop the deportation of Filipino doctors, who had been recruited to fill the shortage of medical personnel in the United States. AALDEF volunteer attorneys represented Chinese Americans arrested in a protest against police brutality in Manhattan's Chinatown and joined a rally to support an innocent bystander, Peter Yew, who was beaten by police after complaining about their mishandling of a minor traffic incident. In 1977, AALDEF organized free legal advice clinics at Hamilton-Madison House, Korean Senior Citizens Society, and other community agencies in New York City. In an early affirmative action case, AALDEF intervened on behalf of the Asian American Law Students Association in Doherty v. Rutgers Law School, defending the inclusion of Asian Americans in minority admissions programs in a lawsuit brought by rejected white law school applicant. AALDEF also filed an amicus brief in the U.S. Supreme Court in Fullilove v. Kreps, supporting the public works set-aside provision of minority businesses, including Asian American enterprises.

=== The 1980s ===
Economic justice was a primary focus in the 1980s. AALDEF represented the Chinese immigrant waiters at Silver Palace restaurant in Manhattan's Chinatown. The workers, who were fired for protesting against the employer who stole their tips, later formed the first independent Chinatown restaurant workers' union in the nation. At the first-ever rally of 15,000 Chinese garment workers at New York Chinatown's Columbus Park, who went on strike for a new Local 23-25 ILGWU union contract, AALDEF was the only community organization invited to speak at this rally because it took a clear stand in support of the labor rights of low-wage immigrant workers. AALDEF also filed amicus briefs in the U.S. Supreme Court supporting the rights of undocumented immigrants to receive a public education (Plyler v. Doe) and to organize under the National Labor Relations Act (Sure-Tan v. NLRB).

AALDEF was active in two national campaigns generating broad pan-Asian American support across the country. The first involved a demand for the federal civil rights prosecution of the murderers of Vincent Chin, the Chinese American engineer beaten to death by two unemployed auto workers in Detroit. The second was the movement for redress for Japanese Americans, who were incarcerated during World War II solely because of their race and national origin. AALDEF testified in support of Japanese American redress before the U.S. Commission on Wartime Relocation and Internment of Civilians, which led to the passage of the Civil Liberties Act of 1988. Civil rights hero Fred Korematsu made his first public appearance in New York City for AALDEF's 10th anniversary celebration at Lincoln Center, featuring the East Coast premiere of Steven Okazaki's film, Unfinished Business, about the Japanese American redress movement.

On a local level, AALDEF represented Dr. Kaushal Sharan, one of several South Asians attacked in Jersey City by a hate group named the "dotbusters". Although federal civil rights charges against his assailants were dropped, AALDEF then worked to secure passage of a hate crimes law in New Jersey and testified before the U.S. House Judiciary Subcommittee on Civil and Constitutional Rights about the rise in anti-Asian violence. AALDEF participated in the formation of the Coalition Against Anti-Asian Violence (now called CAAAV: Organizing Asian Communities), which organized the first educational forum in New York City on hate violence against Asian Americans.

As to housing and environmental justice, AALDEF launched a fight against gentrification and the displacement of low-income immigrant tenants in Manhattan's Chinatown. AALDEF organized the first Chinatown housing fair in New York City, designed to educate residents about rent control and other rent regulation laws and the prohibitions against tenant harassment. In Jin v. Board of Estimate, AALDEF filed an amicus brief in NY state court, arguing that English-language notices of zoning changes violated the due process rights of Chinese-speaking tenants. This favorable decision was later reversed on appeal. AALDEF then litigated Chinese Staff and Workers' Association v. City of New York, and won a landmark New York Court of Appeals case. The state's high court ruled for the first time that new residential developments that may displace low-income tenants and small businesses are subject to environmental review. This decision blocked the construction of a proposed high-rise luxury condominium tower in Chinatown until an environmental assessment statement was prepared.

In 1985, the North Star Fund presented AALDEF with the Frederick Douglass Award for "outstanding contributions to the struggle for political, social and economic justice."

=== The 1990s ===
In 1993, when the Golden Venture freighter ran aground in Far Rockaway, Queens, AALDEF was among the first legal groups to gain access to the Varick Street detention center where hundreds of Chinese nationals were being held. AALDEF later represented Chinese immigrants seeking political asylum.

In 1990, AALDEF supported the Actors' Equity Association to protest the casting of a white British actor in a lead Asian role in the Broadway musical Miss Saigon. AALDEF worked with the New York City Human Rights Commission to organize hearings on the discriminatory hiring practices of Broadway theater producers.

In 1992, AALDEF was the only Asian American group invited to testify before the U.S. House Judiciary Committee on expanding minority language assistance under the Voting Rights Act, affecting 200,000 Asian Americans nationwide.

AALDEF led the advocacy efforts to secure the first fully translated Chinese-language voting machine ballots in New York City under the Voting Rights Act in 1994. Despite initial opposition by the NYC Board of Elections, the Board changed its position after receiving a letter from the U.S. Department of Justice denying preclearance of its language assistance program under the Voting Rights Act.

=== The 2000s ===
After September 11, 2001, AALDEF, located just eight blocks from the World Trade Center, convened a series of emergency meetings with Chinatown and Lower Manhattan advocates to begin the rebuilding process and address the environmental health, housing, and employment problems of displaced residents and workers. As part of the Beyond Ground Zero Network, AALDEF helped to establish a free clinic at Bellevue Hospital to provide treatment for residents and workers with 9/11-related health problems. AALDEF also defended the rights of South Asians, Arabs, Jews, Iranians, and Muslims who were detained without any criminal charges or evidence of wrongdoing. AALDEF challenged the unfair enforcement of post-9/11 immigration laws and counseled hundreds of immigrants facing deportation at legal clinics.

In 2005, AALDEF launched its Anti-Trafficking Initiative to provide legal assistance to Asian women and girls who are survivors of human trafficking. In a 2009 case, AALDEF represented a Filipino woman who sued her employer, a consular official, when she was forced to work as a domestic worker for $100 per month and prevented from leaving the residence. She overcame her employer's defense of diplomatic immunity to her claims of human trafficking, involuntary servitude, and forced labor, and the case was resolved.

With respect to educational equity, AALDEF filed several civil rights complaints on behalf of Asian immigrant students subjected to racial violence and harassment at Lafayette High School and at South Philadelphia High School.

=== The 2010s ===
In 2012, AALDEF intervened in a challenge to New York's congressional redistricting plan. Through collaborative efforts with other civil rights groups, AALDEF developed a Unity Map that was adopted by the federal court to enable fair representation of the growing Asian American population in Queens. This redistricting plan led to the election of Grace Meng, the first Asian American elected to the U.S. House of Representatives from New York.

AALDEF won $400,000 for small businesses in Manhattan's Chinatown in 2012, after the New York City Department of Finance wrongfully charged property owners thousands of dollars in Business Improvement District fees.

In 2012, AALDEF won a $1.2 million judgment in a human trafficking civil suit on behalf of a Filipina domestic worker subjected to involuntary servitude and forced labor in Rhode Island. In 2016, AALDEF also won a $900,000 judgment from a New York federal court for an Asian woman who was trafficked into the U.S. and forced to do household labor for more than a decade, without pay or freedom of movement.

In 2013, AALDEF won a federal ruling striking down a discriminatory zoning ordinance in Bridgewater, New Jersey, designed to prevent an American Muslim community group from building a mosque and community center.

In 2016, in Fisher v. University of Texas at Austin, the U.S. Supreme Court upheld the consideration of race as a factor in university admissions. AALDEF's amicus brief on behalf of 65 Asian American groups and education officials, including Asian American students and faculty at UT-Austin, was cited in the Court's majority opinion upholding equal opportunity in higher education.

In 2016, AALDEF won its legal challenge to a Texas election law requiring interpreters to be registered voters in the county where they provide language assistance. The 5th Circuit federal court of appeals affirmed that the state law violated the Voting Rights Act. AALDEF represented OCA of Greater Houston and Mallika Das, an Indian American voter, who died of cancer before the judge's decision. Her son, Saurabh, said she would have been proud that her case could help many other voters in the future.

In the case Students for Fair Admissions v. President and Fellows of Harvard College, the AALDEF supported Harvard University's case for race-based admissions.

== Programs ==
AALDEF represents individuals and community groups that are most directly affected by racial and economic injustice: immigrants, the working poor, and persons not yet proficient in English. From Chinese take-out delivery workers in New York and Nepalese domestic workers in New Jersey, to Vietnamese American youth in Louisiana and Bangladeshi voters in Michigan, AALDEF addresses the legal needs of diverse Asian American groups.

AALDEF has litigated several precedent-setting cases on behalf of low-wage Asian immigrant workers, winning millions of dollars in back wages and overtime pay owed to these workers in the restaurant and nail salon industries. By working in multiracial coalitions, AALDEF has brought Asian American perspectives to policy debates and organized campaigns to stop hate violence, police misconduct and human trafficking. After the September 11 attacks on the World Trade Center, AALDEF defended the civil liberties of South Asians, Arabs, Jews, Iranians, and Muslims who were the targets of racial and ethnic profiling. AALDEF has worked with grassroots groups to promote educational equity and youth rights and to ensure that Asian Americans have a greater voice in the political process. AALDEF has trained hundreds of young lawyers and students through its internship programs, encouraging Asian Americans to use their legal skills to serve the community.

AALDEF has a 14-person staff, including six attorneys. The organization works with more than 300 volunteers, including pro bono attorneys, community workers, and students. AALDEF receives financial support from foundations, corporations, individual contributions and special fundraising events. AALDEF receives no government funds.

== The Asian American Exit Poll ==
There is relatively little data about the voting patterns of Asian Americans. Asian American voters often are overlooked by the mainstream media and by candidates for political office. As a result, mainstream exit polls typically report racial breakdowns for whites, African Americans, Latinos and "others." When the media neglect the Asian American vote, candidates often follow suit.

Multilingual exit polls give a fuller and more accurate portrait of Asian American voters than polls conducted in English. AALDEF conducted its first exit poll in 1988 in New York City. In the 2008 elections, AALDEF's Asian American Exit Poll reported on the preferences of almost 17,000 Asian American voters in 11 states and Washington, D.C. In the 2009 New York City elections, AALDEF's exit poll found that Asian American voters overwhelmingly supported Asian American candidates.

In the 2012 elections, AALDEF polled 9,096 Asian American voters in 14 states and Washington, D.C.

"The Asian American Vote in 2016" is AALDEF's most recent report on the 2016 multilingual exit poll of 13,846 Asian American voters in 14 states. One news report suggested that Asian American support for President Trump was overstated in national exit polls, which did not survey voters in multiple Asian languages.

In 2018, AALDEF polled 8,058 Asian American voters in the midterm elections in 14 states. The exit poll found that Asian American voters were increasingly supporting Democratic candidates in such states as Georgia, Florida, Texas, Michigan, and Nevada.

== Supporters ==
- AALDEF received its first grant from the New York Foundation in 1976.
