= Texas House Bill 588 =

Texas law

Texas House Bill 588, commonly referred to as the "Top 10% Rule", is a Texas law passed in 1997. It was signed into law by then governor George W. Bush on May 20, 1997. The law guarantees Texas students who graduated in the top ten percent of their high school class automatic admission to all state-funded universities.

== Legislative background ==
Wikipedia The bill was created as a means to avoid the stipulations from the Hopwood v. Texas appeals court case banning the use of affirmative action. The Supreme Court ruled in Grutter v. Bollinger (2003) that affirmative action in college admissions was permissible, effectively overruling Hopwood. UT Austin then reinstated affirmative action for the seats not filled by the Top Ten Percent law.

The law only guarantees admission into university. Students must still find the means to pay, and may not achieve their desired choice of major. (Another existing law, which preceded 588, provides a full tuition scholarship for the class valedictorian of a Texas high school for their freshman year at a state public school.)

== Development ==
The Texas "Top 10% Plan" is a transition from a race-based policy known as affirmative action. When affirmative action was banned, university administrators needed to provide an alternative in order to increase the number of minority students who qualify and apply for admission. Subsequently, the Top 10% law came into existence, it is an alternative educational reform that attempts to provide students with post-secondary incentives that influence their behavior in high school. This policy extends access to Texas's elite flagship universities to students in schools with weak college-going traditions and encourages student engagement across the state by connecting postsecondary opportunities to high school behavior.

== Responses ==
The law has drawn praise and criticism alike. Supporters of the rule argue that it ensures geographic and ethnic diversity in public universities. They also point out that students admitted under the legislation performed better in college than their counterparts. The law has been blamed for keeping students not in the top ten percent but with other credentials, such as high SAT scores or leadership and extracurricular experience, out of the larger "flagship" state universities, such as the University of Texas at Austin and Texas A&M University, College Station. UT-Austin has argued for several years that the law has come to account for too many of its entering students, with 81 percent of the 2008 freshmen having enrolled under it.

== Policy changes ==
Some administrators, such as former University of Texas at Austin President Larry Faulkner, have advocated capping the number of top ten percent students for any year at one-half of the incoming class. However, until May 2009 the Texas Legislature had not revised the law in any way since its inception. A 2007 measure (HB78) was introduced during the 80th Regular Session (2007) but never made it out of committee.

Under legislation approved in May 2009 by the Texas House as part of the 81st Regular Session (Senate Bill 175), UT-Austin (but no other state universities) was allowed to trim the number of students it accepts under the 10 percent rule; UT-Austin could limit those students to 75 percent of entering in-state freshmen from Texas. The University would admit the top 1 percent, the top 2 percent, and so forth until the cap is reached, beginning with the 2011 entering class. UT System Chancellor Francisco Cigarroa and UT-Austin President William Powers Jr. had sought a cap of about 50 percent, but lawmakers (led by Representatives Dan Branch (R-Dallas) and Rep. Mike Villarreal (D-San Antonio)) brokered the compromise.

== Studies ==
A study in 2011 found that the law created a strategic incentive for students to transfer to a high school with lower-achieving peers, in order to graduate in that school's top decile. Students would reduce their labor supply, change living arrangements, and move to new jurisdictions in order to strategically place themselves at schools where they were more likely to be top of their class. The consequence of this behavior is that this may result in crowding out some of the automatic admissions slots that would have gone to disadvantaged and minority students.

A 2023 study found that the law improved educational and economic outcomes for top students from non-elite high schools while the non-top students at the prestigious high schools did not experience worse educational and economic outcomes.
