= Allison D. Burroughs =

American federal judge (born 1961)

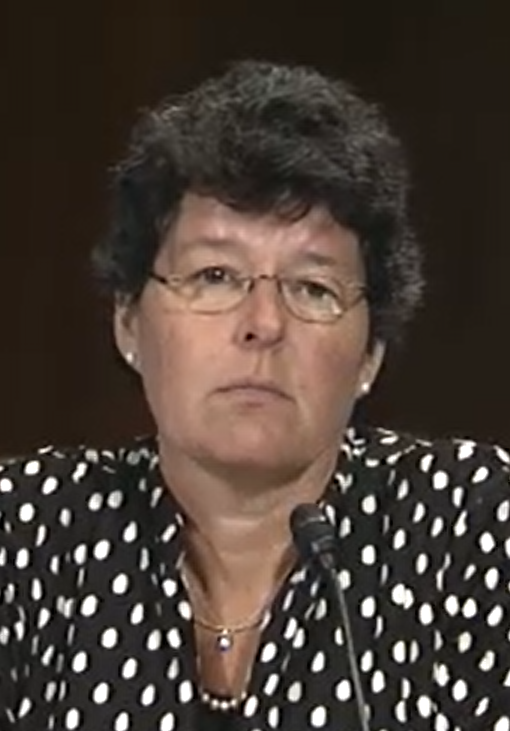

Judge of the United States District Court for the District of Massachusetts
- Incumbent
- Assumed office December 19, 2014
- Appointed by: Barack Obama
- Preceded by: Rya W. Zobel

Personal details
- Born: Allison Dale Burroughs; 1961 (age 64–65) Boston, Massachusetts, U.S.
- Education: Middlebury College (BA); University of Pennsylvania (JD)

Allison Dale Burroughs (born 1961) is an American lawyer and jurist serving as a United States district judge of the U.S. District Court for the District of Massachusetts. She was appointed in 2014 by President Barack Obama. She is best known for ruling that Harvard College's race-conscious admissions process was legal in Students for Fair Admissions v. Harvard (2019).

== Early life ==
Allison Dale Burroughs was born in 1961 in Boston. She received a Bachelor of Arts degree cum laude from Middlebury College. She received a Juris Doctor cum laude in 1988 from the University of Pennsylvania Law School. She began her legal career as a law clerk for Judge Norma Levy Shapiro of the United States District Court for the Eastern District of Pennsylvania from 1988 to 1989. She served as an Assistant United States Attorney in the Eastern District of Pennsylvania from 1989 to 1995 and in the District of Massachusetts from 1995 to 2005. From 2005 to 2014, she was a partner at Nutter McClennen & Fish, where she represented individuals and corporations in criminal and civil proceedings primarily before federal courts.

== Judge ==
On July 31, 2014, President Barack Obama nominated Burroughs to serve as a United States district judge of the United States District Court for the District of Massachusetts to the seat vacated by Judge Rya W. Zobel, who had assumed senior status on April 1, 2014. She received a hearing before the United States Senate Committee on the Judiciary on September 17, 2014. On November 20, her nomination was reported out of committee by voice vote. On December 13, Senate Majority Leader Harry Reid filed a motion to invoke cloture on the nomination. On December 16, Reid withdrew his cloture motion on Burroughs's nomination and the Senate confirmed Burroughs by voice vote. She received her federal judicial commission on December 19 and was sworn in on January 7, 2015.

=== Notable cases ===
Burroughs is most notable for her order that put a hold on President Donald Trump's travel ban in January 2017 (Executive Order 13769) and for presiding over United States v. Salemme, Students for Fair Admissions v. Harvard, and United States v. Babich.

Salemme was the last major trial of American Mafia members. In 2018, Francis Salemme (aka "Cadillac Frank") and co-defendant Paul Weadick were convicted of the murder of Steven A. DiSarro, who disappeared in 1993, and were sentenced to life in prison.

In October 2018, Burroughs held a three-week bench trial in Students for Fair Admissions v. Harvard, a lawsuit challenging Harvard's admissions program as discriminatory against Asian Americans. A decision in favor of the university was announced on October 1, 2019.

United States v. Babich is a criminal case brought against several former executives of the pharmaceutical company Insys Therapeutics. The government alleged that the executives violated the Racketeer Influenced and Corrupt Organizations Act (RICO), 18 U.S.C. 1692 et seq., by engaging in a scheme to sell the fentanyl-based pain medication Subsys by bribing physicians to prescribe it. The indictments led to guilty pleas, including by former Insys CEO Michael Babich. The remaining defendants were tried from January through April 2019. All five remaining defendants, including former billionaire John Kapoor, were convicted of racketeering.

Burroughs also presided over a July 2020 lawsuit filed by Harvard and the Massachusetts Institute of Technology (MIT) that sought to halt an Immigration and Customs Enforcement (ICE) policy that required international students in the U.S. on F-1 visas to depart the country if they would not attend in-person classes during the COVID-19 pandemic. Burroughs announced that the Trump administration had agreed to reverse the policy during a July 14 hearing in her Boston courtroom.

In December 2020, Burroughs presided over a lawsuit brought by five Republicans who lost state and federal legislative races in Massachusetts and sought to overturn the election results. At a December 2020 hearing, she said the plaintiffs' requested relief of invalidating the votes of millions of Massachusetts residents was "too late", "misplaced", and "terribly unfair".

Burroughs has also presided over several class actions related to consumer products. In re Intuniv Antitrust Litigation concerned allegedly anticompetitive agreements between drug makers Shire and Actavis purportedly aimed at charging supracompetitive prices for an ADHD medication. Burroughs's class certification opinions in the matter (one opinion certifying a class of direct purchasers, and one declining to certify a class of indirect, consumer purchasers) are notable for their application of the predominance required for class certification where putative classes contain numerous uninjured members.

In class actions against Nestlé, The Hershey Company, and Mars Inc., Burroughs considered allegations that the companies violated Massachusetts product labeling laws by failing to disclose the use of slave child labour in cocoa production. She dismissed the complaints against the companies in January 2019, a decision upheld by the Court of Appeals for the First Circuit in June 2020. In September 2019, Burroughs also dismissed a class action suit that claimed the packaging of Honey Bunches of Oats cereal was misleading given the cereal's limited honey content.

In February 2020, Burroughs ordered the release of certain grand jury materials related to the Pentagon Papers.

In April 2025, Burroughs issued a temporary restraining order blocking the Department of Energy's 15% cap on indirect costs for higher education grants, citing "immediate and irreparable injury" to universities. The policy, which aimed to reduce federal spending by $405 million annually, was challenged by a coalition of academic institutions and associations, leading to the court's intervention.

On May 23, 2025, Burroughs issued a temporary restraining order blocking the United States Department of Homeland Security's revocation of Harvard University's use of the Student and Exchange Visitor Program, which facilitates enrollment of international students.

On September 3, 2025, Burroughs ruled that the Trump administration had acted unconstitutionally and failed to follow due process when it froze more than $2.6 billion in research funding awarded to Harvard.

On March 31, 2026, Burroughs ruled that the Trump administration's termination of the CBP One app was unlawful and called for the reinstatement of parole for hundreds of thousands of migrants who applied through the app.

== See also ==
- List of Jewish American jurists
- Students for Fair Admissions v. President and Fellows of Harvard College

Legal offices
| Preceded by Rya W. Zobel | Judge of the United States District Court for the District of Massachusetts; 2014–present | Incumbent |
