= Schuette v. Coalition to Defend Affirmative Action =

- Supreme Court of the United States

Argued October 15, 2013 Decided April 22, 2014
- Full case name: Schuette, Attorney General of Michigan v. Coalition to Defend Affirmative Action, Integration and Immigration Rights and Fight for Equality By Any Means Necessary (BAMN) et al.
- Docket no.: 12-682
- Citations: 572 U.S. 291 (more) 134 S. Ct. 1623; 188 L. Ed. 2d 613
- Argument: Oral argument

Case history
- Prior: 539 F. Supp. 2d 924 (E.D. Mich. 2008); 539 F. Supp. 2d 960 (E.D. Mich. 2008); 592 F. Supp. 2d 948 (E.D. Mich. 2008); 652 F.3d 607 (6th Cir. 2011); 701 F.3d 466 (6th Cir. 2012); cert. granted, 568 U.S. 1249 (2013).

Holding
- The Fourteenth Amendment's Equal Protection Clause does not prevent states from enacting bans on affirmative action in education.

Court membership
- Chief Justice John Roberts Associate Justices Antonin Scalia · Anthony Kennedy; Clarence Thomas · Ruth Bader Ginsburg; Stephen Breyer · Samuel Alito; Sonia Sotomayor · Elena Kagan

Case opinions
- Plurality: Kennedy, joined by Roberts, Alito
- Concurrence: Roberts
- Concurrence: Scalia (in judgment), joined by Thomas
- Concurrence: Breyer (in judgment)
- Dissent: Sotomayor, joined by Ginsburg
- Kagan took no part in the consideration or decision of the case.

Laws applied
- U.S. Const. amend. XIV

Schuette v. Coalition to Defend Affirmative Action, 572 U.S. 291 (2014), was a landmark decision of the Supreme Court of the United States concerning affirmative action and race- and sex-based discrimination in public university admissions. In a 6-2 decision, the court held that the Fourteenth Amendment's Equal Protection Clause does not prevent states from enacting bans on affirmative action in education.

The case arose after Michigan voters approved the Michigan Civil Rights Initiative, which amended the state constitution to make affirmative action illegal in public employment and public education. In a plurality opinion joined by two other justices, Justice Anthony Kennedy held that the ban on affirmative action was constitutional. Kennedy wrote that "[t]here is no authority in the Constitution of the United States or in this Court's precedents for the Judiciary to set aside Michigan laws that commit this policy determination to the voters." Justices Antonin Scalia, Clarence Thomas, and Stephen Breyer concurred in the result but filed or joined separate opinions. In her dissenting opinion, Associate Justice Sonia Sotomayor wrote that the voters of Michigan had "changed the basic rules of the political process in that State in a manner that uniquely disadvantaged racial minorities."

== Background ==
In 1961, President John F. Kennedy issued an executive order establishing the concept of affirmative action and mandating that federally financed projects ensure that their hiring and employment practices are free of racial bias. With the enactment of the Civil Rights Act of 1964, discrimination on the basis of race, color, religion, sex or national origin was prohibited.

In the first case involving affirmative action in higher education, the Supreme Court ruled in Regents of the University of California v. Bakke (1978) that the UC Davis medical school admissions program violated the Fourteenth Amendment with the institution of quotas for underrepresented minorities. It did not, however, eliminate race as a factor in university admissions, calling diversity a "compelling interest".

The Fifth Circuit Court of Appeals ruled in Hopwood v. Texas (5th Cir. 1996) that the University of Texas School of Law could not use race as a factor in admissions. This was the first successful legal challenge to racial preferences since Bakke.

Two cases in 2003 involving the University of Michigan found that the university's policy of granting extra points to minorities for undergraduate admissions was unconstitutional (Gratz v. Bollinger) but that a program which gave holistic consideration for being a certain racial minority, though not an automatic boost, in admissions to the law school was constitutional (Grutter v. Bollinger).

Michigan voters approved Proposal 2 in 2006 which amended the state's constitution to make affirmative action illegal in public employment, public education or public contracting purposes, except for actions mandated by federal law or that are necessary in order for an institution to receive federal funding.

The United States Court of Appeals for the Sixth Circuit ruled in 2012 that the ban was unconstitutional.

== Supreme Court ==
The Court heard oral argument on October 15, 2013. John J. Bursch, then the Michigan Solicitor General, argued for the petitioner, Michigan Attorney General Bill Schuette. Mark D. Rosenbaum argued for the Cantrell respondents, and Shanta Driver argued for BAMN. Justice Elena Kagan took no part in the consideration or decision of the case.

=== Opinion and concurrences ===
On April 22, 2014, the court ruled for the petitioner that the ban on affirmative action in the Michigan Constitution is constitutional. Justice Kennedy, writing the plurality opinion, wrote that "[t]here is no authority in the Constitution of the United States or in this Court's precedents for the Judiciary to set aside Michigan laws that commit this policy determination to the voters." Chief Justice Roberts and Justice Alito joined in the plurality.

Chief Justice Roberts also filed a concurring opinion, arguing that the dissent contains a paradox: the governing board banning affirmative action is an exercise of policymaking authority, but others who reach that conclusion (presumed to mean the supporters of Proposal 2) do not take race seriously. He continues that racial preferences may actually do more harm than good, as they reinforce doubt about whether or not minorities belong.

Justice Scalia filed an opinion concurring in the judgment, joined by Justice Thomas. He examines what he calls a "frighteningly bizarre question": Whether the Equal Protection Clause forbids what its text requires. He answers this by quoting his concurrence/dissent in Grutter: that "the Constitution [forbids] government discrimination on the basis of race, and state-provided education is no exception." He asserts that the people of Michigan adopted that understanding of the clause as their fundamental law, and that by adopting it, "they did not simultaneously offend it."

Justice Breyer filed an opinion concurring in the judgment, arguing that the case has nothing to do with reordering the political process, nor moving decision-making power from one level to another, but rather that university boards delegated admissions-related authority to unelected faculty and administration. He further argues that the same principle which supports the right of the people or their representatives to adopt affirmative action policies for the sake of inclusion also gives them the right to vote not to do so, as Michigan did.

=== Dissent ===
Justice Sotomayor filed a dissent, joined by Justice Ginsburg, outlining what she called the nation's "long and lamentable record of stymieing the right of racial minorities to participate in the political process." She charges that "[a] majority of the Michigan electorate changed the basic rules of the political process in that State in a manner that uniquely disadvantaged racial minorities." Sotomayor contended that those opposed to affirmative action policies could have either lobbied the boards of the state's universities to change their policies or, through the electoral process, changed the membership of the boards. She invokes the political-process doctrine, recognized in Hunter v. Erickson (1969) and Washington v. Seattle School District (1982), whereby "[w]hen the majority reconfigures the political process in a manner that burdens only a racial minority, that alteration triggers strict judicial scrutiny." Sotomayor had previously credited her own admission to college to affirmative action, stating "I am the perfect affirmative action baby", and that without affirmative action "it would have been highly questionable if I would have been accepted." In the dissent, Sotomayor notably paraphrased Chief Justice John Roberts's majority opinion in Parents Involved in Community Schools v. Seattle School District No. 1, writing that "The way to stop discrimination on the basis of race is to speak openly and candidly on the subject of race, and to apply the Constitution with eyes open to the unfortunate effects of centuries of racial discrimination."

== See also ==
- Ending Radical and Wasteful Government DEI Programs and Preferencing (14151, 2025)
- Florida Parental Rights in Education Act (HB 1557, 2022)
- Florida Senate Bill 266 (HB 999, 2023)
- Students for Fair Admissions v. Harvard (600 U.S. 181, 2023)
