= Fisher v. University of Texas (2013) =

- Supreme Court of the United States

Argued October 10, 2012 Decided June 24, 2013
- Full case name: Abigail Noel Fisher, Petitioner v. University of Texas at Austin, et al.
- Docket no.: 11-345
- Citations: 570 U.S. 297 (more) 133 S. Ct. 2411; 186 L. Ed. 2d 474
- Argument: Oral argument

Case history
- Prior: Injunction denied, 556 F. Supp. 2d 603 (W.D. Tex. 2008); summary judgment granted, 645 F. Supp. 2d 587 (W.D. Tex. 2009); affirmed, 631 F.3d 213 (5th Cir. 2011); rehearing en banc denied, 644 F.3d 301 (5th Cir. 2011); cert. granted, 565 U.S. 1195 (2012).
- Subsequent: See Fisher v. University of Texas (2016)

Holding
- The Fifth Circuit Court of Appeals failed to apply strict scrutiny in its decision affirming the admissions policy. The decision is vacated, and the case remanded for further consideration.

Court membership
- Chief Justice John Roberts Associate Justices Antonin Scalia · Anthony Kennedy; Clarence Thomas · Ruth Bader Ginsburg; Stephen Breyer · Samuel Alito; Sonia Sotomayor · Elena Kagan

Case opinions
- Majority: Kennedy, joined by Roberts, Scalia, Thomas, Breyer, Alito, Sotomayor
- Concurrence: Scalia
- Concurrence: Thomas
- Dissent: Ginsburg
- Kagan took no part in the consideration or decision of the case.

Laws applied
- U.S. Const. amend. XIV, Grutter v. Bollinger

Fisher v. University of Texas, 570 U.S. 297 (2013), also known as Fisher I (to distinguish it from the 2016 case), is a United States Supreme Court case concerning the affirmative action admissions policy of the University of Texas at Austin. The Supreme Court voided the lower appellate court's ruling in favor of the university and remanded the case, holding that the lower court had not applied the standard of strict scrutiny, articulated in Grutter v. Bollinger (2003) and Regents of the University of California v. Bakke (1978), to its admissions program. The Court's ruling in Fisher took Grutter and Bakke as given and did not directly revisit the constitutionality of using race as a factor in college admissions.

The suit, brought by undergraduate Abigail Fisher in 2008, asked that the Court declare the university's race-conscious admissions inconsistent with Grutter, which had in 2003 established that race had an appropriate but limited role in the admissions policies of public universities. While reasserting that any consideration of race must be "narrowly tailored", with Fisher the Court did not go on to overrule Grutter, a relief for those who feared that the Court would end affirmative action.

The United States District Court heard Fisher v. University of Texas in 2009 and upheld the legality of the university's admission policy in a summary judgment. The case was appealed to the Fifth Circuit which also ruled in the university's favor. The Supreme Court agreed on February 21, 2012, to hear the case. Justice Elena Kagan recused herself because she served as the Solicitor General when the Department of Justice filed an amicus curiae, or friend-of-the-court, brief in the Fisher case when it was pending in the U.S. Court of Appeals for the Fifth Circuit. On June 24, 2013, the Fifth Circuit's decision was vacated, and the case remanded for further consideration in a 7–1 decision, with Justice Ruth Bader Ginsburg dissenting. Justices Antonin Scalia and Clarence Thomas filed concurring opinions.

Applying the Supreme Court's 2013 decision, the Fifth Circuit once again found for UT Austin in 2014. Fisher again appealed the Fifth Circuit's decision, and in 2016 the Supreme Court upheld the lower court in a 4–3 decision.

== Background ==
Plaintiffs Abigail Noel Fisher and Rachel Multer Michalewicz applied to the University of Texas at Austin in 2008 and were denied admission. The two women, both white, filed suit, alleging that the university had discriminated against them on the basis of their race in violation of the Equal Protection Clause of the Fourteenth Amendment. At the time that the initial lawsuit was filed, the University of Texas at Austin accepted students in the top 10% of each Texas high school's graduating class, regardless of their race; under Texas House Bill 588, 81% of 2008's freshman class were admitted under the plan. (Starting with the fall 2010 admission class, Senate Bill 175 adjusted this rule to the top 7 percent, but with no more than 75 percent of freshman slots filled under automatic admissions.)

Applicants who, like Fisher, failed to gain acceptance by automatic admissions can still gain admission by scoring highly in a process that evaluates their talents, leadership qualities, family circumstances, and race. Fisher had a grade point average of 3.59 (adjusted to a 4.0 scale) and was in the top 12% of her class at Stephen F. Austin High School. She scored 1180 on her SAT (measured on the old 1600-point scale, because UT Austin did not consider the writing section in its undergraduate admissions decision for the 2008 incoming freshman class). The 25th and 75th percentiles of the incoming class at UT-Austin were 1120 and 1370 respectively. She was involved in the orchestra and math competitions and volunteered at Habitat for Humanity.

During the case proceedings, Fisher enrolled at Louisiana State University, from which Fisher graduated in 2012 with a degree in finance. In 2011, Michalewicz withdrew from the case, leaving Fisher as the sole plaintiff.

== Lower courts ==
In 2009, United States District Court judge Sam Sparks upheld the university's policy, finding that it meets the standards laid out in Grutter v. Bollinger. That decision was affirmed by a Fifth Circuit panel composed of judges Patrick Higginbotham, Carolyn Dineen King and Emilio M. Garza. In his ruling, Higginbotham wrote that the "ever-increasing number of minorities gaining admission under this 'Top Ten Percent Law' casts a shadow on the horizon to the otherwise-plain legality of the Grutter-like admissions program, the Law's own legal footing aside".

A request for a full-court en banc hearing was denied by a 9–7 vote by circuit judges.

== Original Supreme Court hearing ==
In September 2011, lawyers representing Fisher filed petition seeking review from the Supreme Court. The plaintiff's legal team was assembled by the Project on Fair Representation, a Washington, D.C.–based legal defense fund active in attempts to overturn race-based laws, whose legal fees were paid by Donors Trust, a conservative donor-advised fund. On February 21, 2012, the court granted certiorari in Fisher v. University of Texas at Austin. Justice Elena Kagan recused herself from the case and did not participate in the court's discussions. Kagan's recusal was most likely due to her involvement with the case while she was Solicitor General.

The case was on the Supreme Court calendar for the term beginning in October 2012. There were concerns that if the Court overruled Grutter, affirmative action at public universities would end in the United States. Some argued that the result of such a ruling would decrease the number of black and Hispanic students admitted to American universities while increasing the proportion of white and Asian students.

=== Amicus Briefs ===
Amicus briefs were filed by Teach for America, the Asian American Legal Foundation, the Asian Pacific American Legal Center, the Asian American Legal Defense and Education Fund, the California Association of Scholars and Center for Constitutional Jurisprudence, the Black Student Alliance at The University of Texas, the Mountain States Legal Foundation, the Pacific Legal Foundation, Peter Kirsanow, Stuart Taylor, Jr., the Louis D. Brandeis Center for Human Rights Under Law, and many others.

=== Oral arguments ===
On October 10, 2012, the Supreme Court heard oral arguments in the case. Bert Rein represented the petitioner, Gregory G. Garre, a former Solicitor General, represented the respondent, the university, and Solicitor General Donald Verrilli, Jr., presented the government's stance in support of the respondent.

During the beginning of the petitioner's argument, Justices Sotomayor and Ginsburg asked questions about whether the case was moot. Specifically, they were concerned with the university's arguments that Fisher would not have earned admission regardless of her race, that she had already graduated from college, and that she only named the $100 application fee as real damages. Scalia commented that the harm of racial discrimination alone created an active controversy under the Court's previous Equal Protection jurisprudence.

Justices Scalia, Alito, and Roberts asked many questions about the definition of a "critical mass", which Grutter named as the central measure of diversity. Scalia started calling it a "critical cloud" after the university's lawyer failed, upon multiple requests, to define the central measure of diversity. Chief Justice Roberts asked whether an applicant who was one-quarter or one-eighth Latino would be permitted by the university to check the "Latino" box. Garre responded that the applicant was entitled to self-identify as any race, subject to discipline under the university's honor code, and that the university did not ever question that determination.

Legal analysts concurred that the process of oral argument indicated that a majority of the justices disliked the university's position.

=== Opinions of the Court ===
The opinion was issued on June 24, 2013. In a 7–1 decision, the Court vacated and remanded the Fifth Circuit's ruling. Writing for the majority, Justice Kennedy concluded that the Fifth Circuit failed to apply strict scrutiny in its decision affirming the admissions policy. Instead, he wrote, the Fifth Circuit held that Fisher could only challenge "whether the University's decision to use race as an admissions factor 'was made in good faith.' It presumed that the school had acted in good faith and gave petitioner the burden of rebutting that presumption". Kennedy argued that per the Grutter ruling, the burden of evidence primarily lies with the university "to prove that its admissions program is narrowly tailored to obtain the educational benefits of diversity".

Justice Scalia wrote a one-paragraph concurring opinion, stating that he still held the view that he first expressed in his concurring opinion in Grutter: "The Constitution proscribes government discrimination on the basis of race, and state-provided education is no exception". Because the petitioner did not ask to overturn the holding in Grutter, that there is a compelling interest in the educational benefits of diversity which justifies racial preferences in university admissions, he joined with the majority in full.

Justice Thomas wrote his own concurrence, stating his reasons for overturning Grutter, and ruled that the use of race in higher education admissions violated the Equal Protection Clause. Thomas concluded that Grutter was a radical departure from the Court's application of the strict scrutiny test. According to Justice Thomas, strict scrutiny had only been previously satisfied where the state actor was acting to protect national security or to remedy its own past discrimination. He wrote that student body diversity was simply not important enough to override the presumption that race-based policies are unconstitutional.

Additionally, comparing such university admissions with desegregation, he wrote that "there is no principled distinction between the University's assertion that diversity yields educational benefits and the segregationists' assertion that segregation yielded those same benefits". He also wrote that he believed that such admissions programs may actually be more harmful: "Blacks and Hispanics admitted to the University as a result of racial discrimination are, on average, far less prepared than their white and Asian classmates...the University's discrimination does nothing to increase the number of blacks and Hispanics who have access to a college education generally...any blacks and Hispanics who likely would have excelled at less elite schools are placed in a position where underperformance is all but inevitable because they are less academically prepared than the white and Asian students with whom they must compete".

In her dissenting opinion, Justice Ginsburg explained her reasons for affirming the Fifth Circuit's ruling. Noting that the university's 10% plan admitted students regardless of their race, she argued that "the University's admissions policy flexibly considers race only as a 'factor of a factor of a factor of a factor' ... and is subject to periodic review to ensure that the consideration of race remains necessary and proper to achieve the University's educational objectives ... As I see it, the Court of Appeals has already completed that inquiry, and its judgment, trained on this Court's Bakke and Grutter pathmarkers, merits our approbation".

== Back to the Fifth Circuit ==
In June 2013, the Supreme Court ruled the Fifth Circuit had failed to apply strict scrutiny to the university's race-conscious admissions policy and sent the case back to the Fifth Circuit court. In November, the Fifth Circuit court heard oral arguments from both sides. In their questions during the arguments, Judges Patrick Higginbotham, Carolyn Dineen King, and Emilio M. Garza focused on the way the university defines "critical mass" as well as past attempts the university has made to increase minority enrollment.

On July 15, 2014, the Fifth Circuit announced its decision in favor of UT Austin, with Judge Garza dissenting. In its decision, the majority wrote, "It is equally settled that universities may use race as part of a holistic admissions program where it cannot otherwise achieve diversity." Fisher sought a rehearing en banc with the Fifth Circuit which was denied on 12 of November in a 10–5 decision. Fisher then filed a petition for certiorari to the Supreme Court.

== Return to the Supreme Court ==
On June 29, 2015, the Supreme Court announced that they would hear another challenge to UT Austin's admissions policy. The case was assigned docket number 14-981 and oral arguments were heard on December 9. Legal analysts predicted from the justices' questions that the Court would likely either remand the case again to the lower courts for additional fact-finding, strike down UT Austin's policy, or strike down affirmative action in college admissions nationwide.

During oral arguments, Justice Scalia raised the mismatching theory and questioned whether black students admitted to top-tier schools suffer because the courses are too difficult. Scalia commented that "There are those who contend that it does not benefit African Americans to get them into the University of Texas, where they do not do well, as opposed to having them go to a less-advanced school, a slower-track school where they do well. One of the briefs pointed out that most of the black scientists in this country don't come from schools like the University of Texas. They come from lesser schools where they do not feel that they're being pushed ahead in classes that are too fast for them." The comments led to outcry from the University of Texas's African American students, and spurred the creation of the Twitter hashtag #StayMadAbby. As Justice Antonin Scalia died on February 13, 2016, and Justice Elena Kagan recused herself, the case was decided by the seven remaining justices. On June 23, 2016, a 4–3 vote affirmed the Fifth Circuit's decision for UT Austin.

== See also ==
- List of United States Supreme Court cases, volume 570
- Fisher v. University of Texas (2016)
