= Grutter v. Bollinger =

- Supreme Court of the United States

Argued April 1, 2003 Decided June 23, 2003
- Full case name: Barbara Grutter, Petitioner v. Lee Bollinger, et al.
- Docket no.: 02-241
- Citations: 539 U.S. 306 (more) 123 S.Ct. 2325; 156 L. Ed. 2d 304; 71 U.S.L.W. 4498; 91 Fair Empl.Prac.Cas. (BNA) 1761; 84 Empl. Prac. Dec. (CCH) ¶ 41,415; 177 Ed. Law Rep. 801; 03 Cal. Daily Op. Serv. 5378; 2003 Daily Journal D.A.R. 6800; 16 Fla. L. Weekly Fed. S 367

Case history
- Prior: Held for Plaintiff and enjoined use of current admissions policy, 137 F. Supp. 2d 821 (E.D. Mich. 2001); reversed, 288 F.3d 732 (6th Cir. 2002) (en banc); certiorari granted 537 U.S. 1043 (2002)
- Subsequent: Rehearing denied, 539 U.S. 982 (2003)

Holding
- University of Michigan Law School admissions program that gave special consideration for being a certain racial minority did not violate the Fourteenth Amendment.

Court membership
- Chief Justice William Rehnquist Associate Justices John P. Stevens · Sandra Day O'Connor; Antonin Scalia · Anthony Kennedy; David Souter · Clarence Thomas; Ruth Bader Ginsburg · Stephen Breyer

Case opinions
- Majority: O'Connor, joined by Stevens, Souter, Ginsburg, Breyer; Scalia, Thomas (in part)
- Concurrence: Ginsburg, joined by Breyer
- Concur/dissent: Scalia, joined by Thomas
- Concur/dissent: Thomas, joined by Scalia (Parts I–VII)
- Dissent: Rehnquist, joined by Scalia, Kennedy, Thomas
- Dissent: Kennedy

Laws applied
- U.S. Const. amend. XIV
- Abrogated by
- Students for Fair Admissions v. Harvard (2023)

Grutter v. Bollinger, 539 U.S. 306 (2003), was a landmark case of the Supreme Court of the United States concerning affirmative action in student admissions. The Court held that a student admissions process that favors "underrepresented minority groups" did not violate the Fourteenth Amendment's Equal Protection Clause so long as it took into account other factors evaluated on an individual basis for every applicant. The decision largely upheld the Court's decision in Regents of the University of California v. Bakke (1978), which allowed race to be a consideration in admissions policy but held racial quotas to be unconstitutional. In its companion case, Gratz v. Bollinger (2003), the Court struck down a points-based admissions system that awarded an automatic bonus to the admissions scores of minority applicants.

The case arose after a prospective student to the University of Michigan Law School alleged that she had been denied admission because the school gave certain minority groups a significantly greater chance of admission. The school admitted that its admission process favored certain minority groups, but argued that there was a compelling state interest to ensure a "critical mass" of students from minority groups. In a majority opinion joined by four other justices, Justice Sandra Day O'Connor held that the Constitution "does not prohibit the law school's narrowly tailored use of race in admissions decisions to further a compelling interest in obtaining the educational benefits that flow from a diverse student body."

In her majority opinion, O'Connor wrote that "race-conscious admissions policies must be limited in time," adding that the "Court expects that 25 years from now, the use of racial preferences will no longer be necessary to further the interest approved today." Justices Ruth Bader Ginsburg and Stephen Breyer joined the Court's opinion, but did not subscribe to the belief that the affirmative measures in question would be unnecessary in 25 years. In a dissent joined by three other justices, Chief Justice William Rehnquist argued that the university's admissions system was, in fact, a thinly veiled and unconstitutional quota system.

In 2023, 20 years later, the Supreme Court effectively overruled Grutter v. Bollinger in Students for Fair Admissions v. Harvard. It ruled that that affirmative action in student admissions violated the Equal Protection Clause of the Fourteenth Amendment.

== Dispute ==
When the University of Michigan Law School denied admission to Barbara Grutter, a Michigan resident with a 3.8 GPA and 161 LSAT score, she filed this suit, alleging that respondents had discriminated against her on the basis of race in violation of the Fourteenth Amendment, Title VI of the Civil Rights Act of 1964, as well as 42 U.S.C. § 1981; that she was rejected because the Law School uses race as a "predominant" factor, giving applicants belonging to certain minority groups a significantly greater chance of admission than students with similar credentials from disfavored racial groups; and that respondents had no compelling interest to justify that use of race. Lee Bollinger (then-President of the University of Michigan), was the named defendant of this case.

The University argued that there was a compelling state interest to ensure a "critical mass" of students from minority groups, particularly African Americans and Hispanics, which is realized within the student body. They argued that this aims to "ensure that these minority students do not feel isolated or like spokespersons for their race; to provide adequate opportunities for the type of interaction upon which the educational benefits of diversity depend; and to challenge all students to think critically and re-examine stereotypes."

== Lower courts ==
In March 2001, U.S. District Court Judge Bernard A. Friedman ruled that the admissions policies were unconstitutional because they "clearly consider" race and are "practically indistinguishable from a quota system." Due to the significance of the case, the Court of Appeals agreed to hear the case en banc. In May 2002, in a closely divided 5–4 ruling, the Sixth Circuit Court of Appeals reversed the decision, citing the Bakke decision and allowing the use of race to further the "compelling interest" of diversity. The plaintiffs subsequently requested the Supreme Court review. The Court agreed to hear the case, the first time the Court had heard a case on affirmative action in education since the landmark Bakke decision of 25 years prior.

On April 1, 2003 the US Supreme Court heard oral arguments for Grutter. The Court allowed the recordings of the arguments to be released to the public the same day, only the second time the Court had allowed same-day release of oral arguments. The first time was Bush v. Gore, 531 U.S. 98 (2000), the case that ultimately ended the 2000 presidential election.

== Supreme Court's decision ==
The Court's majority ruling, authored by Justice Sandra Day O'Connor, held that the United States Constitution "does not prohibit the law school's narrowly tailored use of race in admissions decisions to further a compelling interest in obtaining the educational benefits that flow from a diverse student body." The Court held that the law school's interest in obtaining a "critical mass" of minority students was indeed a "tailored use". O'Connor noted that sometime in the future, perhaps twenty-five years hence, racial affirmative action would no longer be necessary in order to promote diversity. It implied that affirmative action should not be allowed permanent status and that eventually a "colorblind" policy should be implemented. The opinion read, "race-conscious admissions policies must be limited in time." "The Court takes the Law School at its word that it would like nothing better than to find a race-neutral admissions formula and will terminate its use of racial preferences as soon as practicable. The Court expects that 25 years from now, the use of racial preferences will no longer be necessary to further the interest approved today." The phrase "25 years from now" was echoed by Justice Thomas in his dissent. Justice Thomas, writing that the system was "illegal now", concurred with the majority only on the point that he agreed the system would still be illegal 25 years hence.

The decision largely upheld the position asserted in Justice Powell's concurrence in Regents of the University of California v. Bakke, which allowed race to be a consideration in admissions policy, but held that quotas were illegal.

Public universities and other public institutions of higher education across the nation are now allowed to use race as a plus factor in determining whether a student should be admitted. While race may not be the only factor, the decision allows admissions bodies to take race into consideration along with other individualized factors in reviewing a student's application. O'Connor's opinion answers the question for the time being as to whether "diversity" in higher education is a compelling governmental interest. As long as the program is "narrowly tailored" to achieve that end, it seems likely that the Court will find it constitutional.

In the majority were Justices O'Connor, Stevens, Souter, Ginsburg, and Breyer. Chief Justice Rehnquist and Justices Scalia, Kennedy, and Thomas dissented. Much of the dissent concerned a disbelief in the validity of the law school's claim that the system was necessary to create a "critical mass" of minority students and provide a diverse educational environment. In the dissent, Chief Justice Rehnquist used admissions data to argue that unconstitutional discrimination occurred, despite the precedent set in McCleskey v. Kemp that dismisses statistical racial disparities as doctrinally irrelevant in equal protection claims.

The case was heard in conjunction with Gratz v. Bollinger, 539 U.S. 244 (2003), in which the Court struck down the University of Michigan's more rigid, point-based undergraduate admission policy, which was essentially deemed a quota system. The case generated a record number of amicus curiae briefs from institutional supporters of affirmative action. A lawyer who filed an amicus curiae brief on behalf of members and former members of the Pennsylvania legislature, State Rep. Mark B. Cohen of Philadelphia, said that Sandra Day O'Connor's majority decision in Grutter v. Bollinger was a "ringing affirmation of the goal of an inclusive society." In both Grutter and Gratz, O'Connor was the swing vote.

== Dissent ==
Chief Justice Rehnquist, joined by Justice Scalia, Justice Kennedy, and Justice Thomas, argued the Law School's admissions policy was an attempt to achieve an unconstitutional type of racial balancing. The Chief Justice attacked the Law School's asserted goal of reaching a "critical mass" of minority students, finding the absolute number of African-American, Hispanic, and Native American students varied markedly, which is inconsistent with the concept in that one would think the same size critical mass would be needed for all minority groups. He noted that "[f]rom 1995 through 2000, the Law School admitted... between 13 and 19... Native American[s], between 91 and 108... African American[s], and between 47 and 56... Hispanic[s]... One would have to believe that the objectives of 'critical mass' offered by respondents are achieved with only half the number of Hispanics, and one-sixth the number of Native Americans as compared to African Americans." Citing admissions statistics, the Chief Justice noted the tight correlation between the percentage of applicants and admittees of a given race and argued that the numbers were "far too precise to be dismissed as merely the result of the school paying 'some attention to [the] numbers.'"

Justice Thomas, joined by Justice Scalia, issued a strongly worded opinion, concurring in part and dissenting in part, arguing that if Michigan could not remain a prestigious institution and admit students under a race-neutral system, the "Law School should be forced to choose between its classroom aesthetic and its exclusionary admissions system." In Justice Thomas' opinion, there is no compelling state interest in Michigan maintaining an elite law school, because a number of states do not have law schools, let alone elite ones. Moreover, Justice Thomas noted that in United States v. Virginia, 518 U.S. 515 (1996), the Court required the Virginia Military Institute to radically reshape its admissions process and the character of that institution.

Another criticism raised by Justice Thomas compared Michigan Law to the University of California, Berkeley School of Law, where California's Proposition 209 had barred Berkeley Law from "granting preferential treatment on the basis of race in the operation of public education." Despite Proposition 209, however, Berkeley Law was still able to achieve a diverse student body. According to Thomas, "the Court is willfully blind to the very real experience in California and elsewhere, which raises the inference that institutions with 'reputations for excellence'...rivaling [Michigan Law's] have satisfied their sense of mission without resorting to prohibited racial discrimination."

A final criticism leveled at Justice O'Connor's opinion was the length of time the racial admissions policy will be lawful. Justice Thomas concurred that racial preferences would be unlawful in 25 years, however, he contended that in fact the Court should have found race-based affirmative action programs in higher education unlawful now:

I therefore can understand the imposition of a 25-year ban limit only as a holding that the deference the Court pays to the Law School's educational judgments and refusal to change its admissions policies will itself expire. At that point these policies will clearly have failed to "'eliminate the [perceived] need for any racial or ethnic'" discrimination because the academic credentials gap will still be there. [citation omitted] The Court defines this time limit in terms of narrow tailoring, [internal citation omitted] but I believe this arises from its refusal to define rigorously the broad state interest vindicated today. [internal citation omitted]. With these observations, I join the last sentence of Part III of the opinion of the Court.

== Timeline of federal courts' decisions ==
- The District Court found the Law School's use of race as an admissions factor unlawful.
- The Sixth Circuit reversed, holding that Justice Powell's opinion in Bakke was binding precedent establishing diversity as a compelling state interest, and that the Law School's use of race was narrowly tailored because race was merely a "potential 'plus' factor" and because the Law School's program was virtually identical to the Harvard admissions program described approvingly by Justice Powell and appended to his Bakke opinion.
- The Supreme Court affirmed the Sixth Circuit's reversal of the District Court decision, thereby upholding the University's admissions policy.

== Law adopted post case ==
Following the decision, petitions were circulated to change the Michigan State Constitution. The measure, called the Michigan Civil Rights Initiative, or Proposal 2, passed in November 2006 and prohibited the use of race in the Law School admissions processes. In this respect, Proposal 2 is similar to California's Proposition 209 and Washington's Initiative 200, other initiatives that also banned the use of race in public university admissions decisions.

The United States Court of Appeals for the Sixth Circuit overturned MCRI on July 1, 2011. Judges R. Guy Cole Jr. and Martha Craig Daughtrey said that "Proposal 2 reorders the political process in Michigan to place special burdens on minority interests." This decision was upheld by the full Court of Appeals on November 16, 2012. After the ruling, Michigan Attorney General Bill Schuette announced he would appeal the court ruling to the Supreme Court. On March 25, 2013 the Supreme Court granted a writ of certiorari, agreeing to hear the case. The Court ultimately upheld MCRI in Schuette v. Coalition to Defend Affirmative Action.

The Supreme Court decided a challenge to the University of Texas at Austin's admission policy, Fisher v. University of Texas, in June 2013. In this case, the Court reaffirmed that universities were entitled to deference on their judgment that diversity is a compelling state interest. Importantly, though, the Court ruled that a university was entitled to "no deference" on its judgment that race-based affirmative action was necessary to achieve diversity and its educational benefits. The Court remanded the case to the Fifth Circuit Court of Appeals for reconsideration, and that court again upheld UT's use of race. The plaintiff again appealed to the Supreme Court in 2016, which held that the Court of Appeals for the Fifth Circuit correctly found that the University of Texas at Austin's undergraduate admissions policy survived strict scrutiny, in accordance with Fisher v. University of Texas (2013).

The same advocacy group and legal team challenging UT Austin also filed lawsuits against Harvard University (Students for Fair Admissions v. Harvard) in November 2014. On June 29, 2023, the Roberts Court decided in Harvard that the university's affirmative action program constituted unlawful racial discrimination, effectively overturning Grutter.

== Further challenge ==
The Supreme Court granted certiorari to Students for Fair Admissions v. Harvard, dealing with race-based admissions at Harvard in January 2022. The Court issued its opinion in the two cases and found that the colleges did not properly follow the Grutter standard in the manner in which race was incorporated into the admissions process.

== See also ==
- Regents of the University of California v. Bakke (1978)
- Gratz v. Bollinger (2003)
- Fisher v. University of Texas (2013)
- List of United States Supreme Court cases, volume 539
- Affirmative action at the University of Michigan
