= Fisher v. University of Texas (2016) =

- Supreme Court of the United States

Argued December 9, 2015 Decided June 23, 2016
- Full case name: Abigail Noel Fisher, Petitioner v. University of Texas at Austin, et al.
- Docket no.: 14-981
- Citations: 579 U.S. 365 (more) 136 S. Ct. 2198; 195 L. Ed. 2d 511
- Argument: Oral argument

Case history
- Prior: See Fisher v. University of Texas (2013)

Holding
- The race-conscious admissions program in use at the time of petitioner's application is lawful under the Equal Protection Clause. The judgement of the Fifth Circuit is affirmed.

Court membership
- Chief Justice John Roberts Associate Justices Anthony Kennedy · Clarence Thomas; Ruth Bader Ginsburg · Stephen Breyer; Samuel Alito · Sonia Sotomayor; Elena Kagan

Case opinions
- Majority: Kennedy, joined by Ginsburg, Breyer, Sotomayor
- Dissent: Thomas
- Dissent: Alito, joined by Roberts, Thomas
- Kagan took no part in the consideration or decision of the case.

Laws applied
- U.S. Const. amend. XIV

Fisher v. University of Texas, 579 U.S. 365 (2016), also known as Fisher II (to distinguish it from the 2013 case), is a United States Supreme Court case that held that the Court of Appeals for the Fifth Circuit had correctly found that the University of Texas at Austin's undergraduate admissions policy survived strict scrutiny, in accordance with Fisher v. University of Texas (2013), which ruled that strict scrutiny should be applied to determine the constitutionality of the University's race-conscious admissions policy.

The decision was overturned by Students for Fair Admissions v. Harvard (2023) seven years later.

== Background ==
Plaintiffs Abigail Noel Fisher and Rachel Multer Michalewicz applied to the University of Texas at Austin in 2008 and were denied admission. The two women, both white, filed suit, alleging that the University had discriminated against them on the basis of their race in violation of the Equal Protection Clause of the Fourteenth Amendment. At the time that the initial lawsuit was filed, the University of Texas at Austin accepted students in the top 10% of each Texas high school's graduating class, regardless of their race; under Texas House Bill 588, 81% of 2008's freshman class were admitted under the plan. (Starting with the fall 2010 admission class, Senate Bill 175 adjusted this rule to the top 7 percent, but with no more than 75 percent of freshman slots filled under automatic admissions.)

Applicants who, like Fisher, failed to gain acceptance by automatic admissions can still gain admission by scoring highly in a process that evaluates their talents, leadership qualities, family circumstances, and race. Fisher had a grade point average of 3.59 (adjusted to a 4.0 scale) and was in the top 12% of her class at Stephen F. Austin High School. She scored 1180 on her SAT out of 1600, around the average SAT score for that year (1511 out of 2400, or 1100 out of 1600). The 25th and 75th percentiles of the incoming class at UT-Austin were 1120 and 1370, respectively. Fisher was involved in the orchestra and math competitions and volunteered at Habitat for Humanity.

In 2009, United States District Court judge Sam Sparks upheld the University's policy, finding that it meets the standards laid out in Grutter v. Bollinger. That decision was affirmed by a Fifth Circuit panel composed of judges Patrick Higginbotham, Carolyn Dineen King and Emilio M. Garza. In his ruling, Higginbotham wrote that the "ever-increasing number of minorities gaining admission under this 'Top Ten Percent Law' casts a shadow on the horizon to the otherwise-plain legality of the Grutter-like admissions program, the Law's own legal footing aside." A request for a full-court en banc hearing was denied by a 9–7 vote.

In September 2011, lawyers representing Fisher filed petition seeking review from the Supreme Court. On February 21, 2012, the court granted certiorari in Fisher v. University of Texas at Austin. The Supreme Court heard the oral argument in October 2012, and handed down its decision on June 24, 2013. In a 7–1 decision, the Court vacated and remanded the Fifth Circuit's ruling. Writing for the majority, Justice Kennedy concluded that the Fifth Circuit failed to apply strict scrutiny in its decision affirming the admissions policy. Instead, he wrote, the Fifth Circuit held that Fisher could only challenge whether the University's decision to use race as an admissions factor was made in good faith. Justice Ginsburg was the lone dissenter, who argued in favor of affirming the judgment of the Fifth Circuit in its entirety.

On remand, in November, the Fifth Circuit court heard oral arguments from both sides. On July 15, 2014, the Fifth Circuit announced its decision in favor of UT Austin, with Judge Garza dissenting. Fisher sought a rehearing en banc with the Fifth Circuit, which was denied on November 12, 2014, in a 10–5 decision. Fisher then filed a petition for certiorari to the Supreme Court. The Supreme Court again agreed to hear the case on June 29, 2015, to decide whether the Fifth Circuit's determination that the University of Texas at Austin's use of racial preferences passed strict scrutiny and can be sustained. Justice Elena Kagan again recused herself from this case due to her prior involvement as Solicitor General.

== Oral argument ==
On June 29, 2015, the Supreme Court granted Fisher's second challenge on UT Austin's admissions policy. The case was assigned docket number 14-981 and oral arguments were heard on December 9. Legal analysts predicted from the justices' questions that the Court would likely either remand the case again to the lower courts for additional fact-finding, strike down UT Austin's policy, or strike down affirmative action in college admissions nationwide.

During oral arguments, Justice Scalia raised the mismatching theory and questioned whether black students admitted to top-tier schools suffer because the courses are too difficult. Scalia commented: "There are those who contend that it does not benefit African Americans to get them into the University of Texas, where they do not do well, as opposed to having them go to a less-advanced school, a slower-track school where they do well. One of the briefs pointed out that most of the black scientists in this country don't come from schools like the University of Texas. They come from lesser schools where they do not feel that they're being pushed ahead in classes that are too fast for them." The comments led to outcry from the University of Texas's African American students, and spurred the creation of the Twitter hashtag #StayMadAbby. As Justice Antonin Scalia died on February 13, 2016, and Justice Elena Kagan had recused herself, the case was decided by the seven remaining justices.

== Decision ==
Fisher II was decided by a 4–3 decision (Elena Kagan had recused herself due to prior involvement, while Antonin Scalia died shortly before the rendering, although he opined on the case publicly). The majority opinion was authored by Justice Kennedy and joined by Justices Ginsburg, Breyer, and Sotomayor. The majority upheld the lower court.

The opinion summarized that Fisher I set three controlling principles: strict scrutiny of affirmative-action admissions processes, judicial deference to reasoned explanations of the decision to pursue student body diversity, and no judicial deference for the determination of whether the use of race in admissions processes is narrowly tailored. It then noted that the University of Texas' combined Top Ten Percent-holistic admission policy is unique and data on resulting diversity was limited; however, it noted that the university should regularly evaluate available data and "tailor its approach in light of changing circumstances, ensuring that race plays no greater role than is necessary to meet its compelling interest."

The Court refused the petitioner's four arguments against the admissions policy. First, the Court upheld that the university's rationale for diversity-associated goals as "sufficiently measurable to permit judicial scrutiny of the policies adopted to reach them," despite a lack of a numerical quota. The goals that the Court affirmed as sufficiently measurable included the "destruction of stereotypes," promotion of "cross-racial understanding," preparation of students for "an increasingly diverse workforce and society," and cultivation of "leaders with legitimacy in the eyes of the citizenry." Second, the court found that the university presented sufficient evidence to show that in the seven years between the Hopwood decision and the implementation of the combined academic-holistic admissions process, race-neutral policies and increased outreach efforts were insufficient to achieve these goals. Third, the court found that "consideration of race has had a meaningful, if still limited, effect on the diversity of the University's freshman class," and that such a limited effect "should be a hallmark of narrow tailoring, not evidence of unconstitutionality." Finally, the court found that the petitioner failed "to offer any meaningful way in which the University could have improved upon" its prior race-neutral efforts to achieve diversity-associated goals, including expanding the Top Ten Percent rule, which would leave, as quoted from the Grutter decision, "a gap in an admissions process seeking to create the multidimensional diversity" envisioned by the Bakke decision.

In conclusion, the majority reiterated that the University has an ongoing obligation to use available data "to assess whether changing demographics have undermined the need for a race-conscious policy; and to identify the effects, both positive and negative, of the affirmative-action measures it deems necessary."

In a lengthy dissent joined by Chief Justice Roberts and Justice Thomas, Justice Alito wrote that the university's stated interests in diversity were not sufficiently measurable and upon review were "shifting" as compared to those from Fisher I, "unpersuasive, and, at times, less than candid." Though Alito noted that the articulated goals were "laudable," he wrote that they were "not concrete or precise," and "offer[ed] no limiting principle for the use of racial preferences." Alito questioned how "a court would ever be able to determine whether stereotypes have been adequately destroyed" or "whether cross-racial understanding has been adequately achieved[.]" He further noted that "[i]f a university can justify racial discrimination simply by having a few employees opine that racial preferences are necessary to accomplish these nebulous goals, . . . then the narrow tailoring inquiry [of strict scrutiny] is meaningless. Courts will [effectively] be required to defer to the judgment of university administrators, and affirmative-action policies will be completely insulated from judicial review."

Additionally, Alito reiterated the circuit court dissent's claim that the Circuit Court majority believed that automatically admitted minority students were "somehow more homogeneous, less dynamic, and more undesirably stereotypical than those admitted under holistic review."

Justice Thomas also authored a dissent. In this dissent, he reiterated the thoughts expressed in his concurrence in Fisher I, namely that "a State's use of race in higher education admissions decisions is categorically prohibited by the Equal Protection Clause."

== Analysis ==
Lauren Cyr of Clark University writes that while the court's decision ultimately upheld the university's race-conscious policies, it also rejected the possibility of using such policies to redress past racial discrimination; in doing so, the court affirmed earlier rulings that oriented affirmative action away from ideas of social justice and instead toward promoting multiculturalism. Cyr writes that Fisher's arguments "revived right-wing challenges to affirmative action" by "echoing long-standing assertions of 'reverse discrimination' and 'reverse racism'".
