= Race-conscious policy =

Policies that aim to improve the conditions of racial minorities

A race-conscious policy is a policy that aims to improve the conditions of racial minorities. In the United States, such policies are typically aimed at improving the status of African Americans. Many different kinds of race-conscious policies exist, ranging from nondiscrimination policy to strict numerical racial quotas. Their main purpose is twofold: to compensate for past discrimination against the target race, and to increase equality of opportunity.

== Education ==
In the United States, race-conscious policies like desegregation busing have long been used to counteract school segregation. The Supreme Court of the United States ruled in favor of those measures more often in the 1960s and the 1970s than it has since then.

== International variations ==
France, unlike many other countries in Western Europe (including the United Kingdom), has avoided adopting race-conscious policies. Variations in the policies between the United Kingdom and France are in large part by the different frames through which the policies were portrayed in both countries.

== Public opinion ==
In the United States, whites are the least supportive of race-conscious policies, and blacks are the most supportive of them. Latinos and Asians take intermediate stances in their opinions of those policies. That pattern persists after controlling for measures of racial prejudice, class status, and other factors. Among white liberals, racial resentment predicts support for race-conscious programs only for black students. In contrast, among white conservatives, racial resentment is closely related to opposition to such programs regardless of the recipient's race.

== See also ==
- Affirmative action
- Color consciousness
- Diversity, equity, and inclusion
- Identity politics
- Racial color blindness
- Reparations for slavery
