= Affirmative action =

Policies aiming to increase inclusion of people from marginalized groups

Affirmative action (also sometimes called reservations, alternative access, positive discrimination or positive action in various countries' laws and policies) (Note: Attributed to multiple references:) refers to a set of practices within a government or organization seeking to address systemic discrimination. Affirmative action policies, therefore, refers to the application of these practices in motion and their implementation in professional guidelines and usage. Historically and internationally, support for affirmative action has been justified by the idea that it may help with bridging inequalities in employment and pay, increasing access to education, and promoting diversity, social equity, and social inclusion (DEI) and redressing wrongs, harms, or hindrances, also called substantive equality.

The nature of affirmative-action policies varies from region to region and exists on a spectrum from a hard quota to merely targeting encouragement for increased participation. Some countries use a quota system to reserve a certain percentage of government jobs, political positions, and school vacancies for members of a certain group. This ensures that a set number or percentage of minorities are included, which prevents creating an imbalance in diversity or displaying exceeding bias towards these groups. Hence, underrepresented groups are given weightage in admissions processes, but only up to a certain limit. An example of this is the reservation system in India. In some other jurisdictions where quotas are not used, minority-group members are given preference or special consideration in selection processes. In the United States, affirmative action by executive order originally meant selection without regard to race but preferential treatment was widely used in college admissions, as upheld in the 2003 Supreme Court case Grutter v. Bollinger, until 2023, when this was overturned in Students for Fair Admissions v. Harvard.

A variant of affirmative action more common in Europe is known as positive action, wherein equal opportunity is promoted by encouraging underrepresented groups into a field. This is often described as being "color blind", but some sociologists have argued that this is insufficient to achieve substantive equality of outcomes based on race.

Affirmative action is controversial and public opinion on the subject is divided. Supporters of affirmative action argue that it promotes substantive equality for group outcomes and representation for groups, which are socio-economically disadvantaged or have faced historical discrimination or oppression. Opponents of affirmative action have argued that it is a form of reverse discrimination, that it tends to benefit the most privileged within minority groups at the expense of the least fortunate within majority groups, or that—when applied to universities—it can hinder minority students by placing them in courses for which they have not been adequately prepared.

== Origins ==
The term "affirmative action" was first used in the United States in Executive Order 10925, signed by President John F. Kennedy on 6 March 1961, which included a provision that government contractors "take affirmative action to ensure that applicants are employed, and employees are treated [fairly] during employment, without regard to their race, creed, color, or national origin". In 1965, President Lyndon B. Johnson issued Executive Order 11246 which required government employers to "hire without regard to race, religion and national origin" and "take affirmative action to ensure that applicants are employed and that employees are treated during employment, without regard to their race, color, religion, sex or national origin." The Civil Rights Act of 1964 prohibited discrimination on the basis of race, color, religion, sex or national origin. Neither executive order nor The Civil Rights Act authorized group preferences. The Senate floor manager of the bill, Senator Hubert Humphrey, declared that the bill "would prohibit preferential treatment for any particular group" adding "I will eat my hat if this leads to racial quotas." However affirmative action in practice would eventually become synonymous with preferences, goals and quotas as upheld or struck down by Supreme Court decisions even though no law had been passed explicitly permitting discrimination in favor of disadvantaged groups.

Affirmative action is intended to promote the opportunities of defined minority groups within a society to give them equal access to that of the majority population. The philosophical basis of the policy has various rationales, including but not limited to compensation for past discrimination, correction of current discrimination, and the diversification of society. It is often implemented in governmental and educational settings to ensure that designated groups within a society can participate in all promotional, educational, and training opportunities.

The stated justification for affirmative action by its proponents is to help compensate for past discrimination, persecution or exploitation by the ruling class of a culture, and to address existing discrimination.

== Methods of implementation ==
- Specific scholarships and financial aid for certain groups
- Marketing/advertising to groups that the affirmative action is intended to increase
- Specific training or emulation actions for identified audiences
- Relaxation of selection criteria applied to a target audiences

=== Quotas ===
Quotas are numerical requirements for a particular protected characteristic. Examples include racial quotas, gender quotas, reserved political positions and the reservation system. Laws regarding quotas for affirmative action vary widely from nation to nation. While quotas addressing underrepresentation have been described as affirmative action, quotas addressing overrepresentation such as Jewish quotas have been described as discriminatory.

In 2012, the European Union Commission approved a plan for women to constitute 40% of non-executive board directorships in large listed companies in Europe by 2020. Directive (EU) 2022/2381 requires that EU member states adopt by 28 December 2024 laws to ensure that by 30 June 2026 members of the underrepresented sex hold at least 40% of non-executive director positions and at least 33% of all director positions, including both executive and non-executive directors, for listed companies. Directive (EU) 2022/2381 expires on 31 December 2038.

In Sweden, the Supreme Court has ruled that "affirmative action" ethnic quotas in universities are discrimination and hence unlawful. It said that the requirements for the intake should be the same for all. The justice minister said that the decision left no room for uncertainty.

== By gender ==
Several different studies investigated the effect of affirmative action on women. Kurtulus (2012) in her review of affirmative action and the occupational advancement of minorities and women during 1973–2003 showed that the effect of affirmative action on advancing black, Hispanic, and white women into management, professional, and technical occupations occurred primarily during the 1970s and early 1980s. During this period, contractors grew their shares of these groups more rapidly than non-contractors because of the implementation of affirmative action. But the positive effect of affirmative action vanished entirely in the late 1980s, which Kurtulus says may be due to the slowdown into advanced occupation for women and minorities because of the political shift of affirmative action that started with President Reagan. Becoming a federal contractor increased white women's share of professional occupations by 0.183 percentage points, or 9.3 percent, on average during these three decades, and increased black women's share by 0.052 percentage points (or by 3.9 percent). Becoming a federal contractor also increased Hispanic women's and black men's share of technical occupations on average by 0.058 percent and 0.109 percentage points respectively (or by 7.7 and 4.2 percent). These represent a substantial contribution of affirmative action to overall trends in the occupational advancement of women and minorities over the three decades under the study. A reanalysis of multiple scholarly studies, especially in Asia, considered the impact of four primary factors on support for affirmative action programs for women: gender; political factors; psychological factors; and social structure. Kim and Kim (2014) found that, "Affirmative action both corrects existing unfair treatment and gives women equal opportunity in the future." Affirmative action in favor of men can address underrepresentation and discrimination against men in some areas, such as nursing.

== By country ==
In some countries that have laws on racial equality, affirmative action is rendered illegal because it does not treat all races equally. This approach of equal treatment is sometimes described as being "color blind", in hopes that it is effective against discrimination without engaging in reverse discrimination.

In such countries, the focus tends to be on ensuring equal opportunity and, for example, targeted advertising campaigns to encourage ethnic minority candidates to join the police force. This is sometimes called positive action.

=== Africa ===
==== South Africa ====
Between 1948 and 1974, the apartheid government introduced statutes which enshrined racial discrimination in all areas of life. Individuals were classified in a racial hierarchy which placed whites at the top, followed by "Coloureds", then Asians or Indians, with black Africans at the bottom. Benefits were afforded based on this hierarchy, and favoured white-owned, especially Afrikaner-owned companies, which marginalised and excluded black people and limited their employment opportunities. Legislation meant that skilled and highly paid jobs were reserved for white people, and black people were largely used as cheap, unskilled labour, creating and extending the "colour bar" in South African labour. The variation in skills and productivity between groups of people ultimately caused disparities in employment, occupation, and income within labour markets. Following the end of apartheid, affirmative action legislation aimed to address these disparities.

The African National Congress-led government chose to implement affirmative action legislation to correct previous imbalances (a policy known as employment equity), and fulfil the obligations of the Republic as a member of the International Labour Organisation. As a result of the Employment Equity Act and the Broad Based Black Economic Empowerment Act, companies were required to employ previously disenfranchised groups (blacks, Indians, and Coloureds), as well as women and disabled people.

Many have embraced these acts; others have criticised them. Proponents have said that South African affirmative action legislation aims to promote economic growth rather than to redistribute wealth, address vast racial inequalities in wealth and income, and to restore equal access to the benefits of society. Critics suggest these laws limit the free market, raise costs, reduce economic growth, and advantage the black middle class over poorer blacks and other groups. The Supreme Court of Appeal of South Africa ruled that while blacks may be favoured in principle, in practice this should not lead to unfair discrimination against others.

==== Ghana ====
The Parliament of Ghana passed the Affirmative Action Bill on July 30, 2024. The bill aims to increase the number of women in politics, with a target of 30% by 2026, 35% by 2028 and 50% by 2030. The 2024 Ghanaian general election in December was the first with affirmative action legislation in place. In the election campaign, both the ruling New Patriotic Party and the main opposition party NDC voiced their commitment to the targets, in an effort to appeal to women voters. After the election, the number of women remained the same as after the 2020 election (15%). In his inaugural speech on 7 January 2025, the newly elected President John Mahama said the NDC was committed to "breaking the glass ceiling" for women in politics.

=== Asia ===
==== China ====
There is affirmative action in education for minority nationalities in China, this may equate to lowering minimum requirements for the National University Entrance Examination, which is mandatory for all students to enter university. Liangshaoyikuan refers a policy in China on affirmative action in criminal justice.

==== Israel ====
A class-based affirmative action policy was incorporated into the admission practices of the four most selective universities in Israel during the early to mid-2000s. In evaluating the eligibility of applicants, neither their financial status nor their national or ethnic origins are considered; the emphasis is on structural disadvantages, especially neighborhood socioeconomic status and high school rigor, although several individual hardships are also weighed. This policy made the four institutions, especially the echelons at the most selective departments, more diverse than they otherwise would have been. Proponents of this model have said that rising geographic, economic and demographic diversity of the student population suggests the focus on structural determinants of disadvantage yields broad diversity dividends.

In civil service employment, Israeli citizens who are women, Arabs, Blacks or people with disabilities are supported by affirmative action policies. Israeli citizens who are Arabs, Blacks or people with disabilities are also entitled to full university scholarships from the state.

==== India ====
Reservation in India is a form of affirmative action designed to improve the well-being of Scheduled Castes and Scheduled Tribes (SC/ST), and Other Backward Classes (OBC), defined primarily by their caste. Members of these categories comprise about two-thirds of the population of India. According to the Constitution of India, up to 50% of all government-run higher education admissions and government job vacancies may be reserved for members of the SC/ST/OBC-NCL categories, and 10% for those in Economically Weaker Sections (EWS), with the remaining unreserved. In 2014, the Indian National Sample Survey found that 12% of surveyed Indian households had received academic scholarships, with 94% being on account of SC/ST/OBC membership, 2% based on financial weakness and 0.7% based on merit.

==== Indonesia ====
Indonesia has offered affirmative action for native Papuans in education, government civil worker selection, and police & army selection. After the 2019 Papua protests, many Papuan students chose to abandon their scholarship and return to their respective provinces. The program has been subject to criticism, with complaints made towards a lack of sufficient quotas and alleged corruption. Prabowo Subianto, Indonesian defense minister, has expressed that he will direct more effort towards recruiting Papuans to the Indonesian National Armed Forces. Education scholarship by Ministry of Education and Culture, called ADik to the native Papuans and students from perhipery regions close to Indonesian border.

==== Malaysia ====
The Malaysian New Economic Policy (NEP) is a form of ethnicity-based affirmative action aimed at addressing socioeconomic disadvantages among those who are deemed "Bumiputera", which includes the Malay population, Orang Asli, and the indigenous people of Sabah and Sarawak, who together form a majority of the population. Within Malaysia, the Malays (representing 58% of the population) have lower incomes than Chinese Malaysians (22% of the population) and Indian Malaysians (6% of the population), who have traditionally been involved in businesses and industries, and who were also general migrant workers. The mean income for Malays, Chinese and Indians in 1957/58 were 134, 288 and 228 respectively. In 1967/68 it was 154, 329 and 245, and in 1970 it was 170, 390 and 300. Mean income disparity ratio for Chinese/Malays rose from 2.1 in 1957/58 to 2.3 in 1970, whereas for Indians/Malays the disparity ratio also rose from 1.7 to 1.8 in the same period.

To address these inequalities, following the sectarian violence of the 13 May incident in 1969, the NEP was introduced as a time-limited policy, which was supposed to expire after 20 years but remains policy to this day. Although the NEP has succeeded in creating a significant urban Malay and Native Bornean middle class, it has been less effective in eradicating poverty among rural communities. Critics say it has widened disparities between the wealthy and middle classes, and those who are poorest. It has also been described as racially discriminatory.

==== Taiwan ====
A 2004 legislation requires that, for a firm with 100 employees or more wishing to compete for government contracts, at least 1 percent of its employees must be Taiwanese aborigines. Ministry of Education and Council of Aboriginal Affairs announced in 2002 that Taiwanese Aboriginal students would have their high-school or undergraduate entrance exams boosted by 33% for demonstrating some knowledge of their tribal language and culture. The percentage of boost have been revised several times, and the latest percentage is 35% in 2013.

=== Europe ===
==== Denmark ====
Greenlanders have special advantages when applying for university, college or vocation university degrees in Denmark. With these specific rules, Greenlanders can get into degrees without the required grade averages by fulfilling certain criteria. They need to have a grade average of over 6,0 and have lived a certain number of years in Greenland. These rules have been in force since 1 January 2014.

==== Finland ====
In certain university education programs, including legal and medical education, there are quotas for persons who reach a certain standard of skills in the Swedish language; for students admitted in these quotas, the education is partially arranged in Swedish. The purpose of the quotas is to guarantee that a sufficient number of professionals with skills in Swedish are educated for nationwide needs.

==== France ====
No distinctions based on race, religion or sex are allowed under the 1958 French Constitution. Since the 1980s, a French version of affirmative action based on neighborhood is in place for primary and secondary education. Some schools, in neighborhoods labeled "Priority Education Zones", are granted more funds than the others. Students from these schools also benefit from special policies in certain institutions (such as Sciences Po).

The French Ministry of Defence tried in 1990 to make it easier for young French soldiers of North-African descent to be promoted in rank and obtain driving licenses. After a strong protest by a young French lieutenant in the Ministry of Defence newspaper (Armées d'aujourd'hui), the driving license and rank plan was cancelled. After the Sarkozy election, a new attempt in favour of Arab-French students was made, but Sarkozy did not gain enough political support to change the French constitution.

After 27 January 2014, following the Norwegian example, women had to represent at least 20% of board members in all stock-exchange-listed or state-owned companies. After 27 January 2017, the proportion increased to 40%. All appointments of men as directors were deemed invalid as long as the quotas were not met, and monetary penalties may apply for other directors.

==== Germany ====
Article 3 of the German Basic Law provides for equal rights of all people regardless of sex, race or social background. There are programs stating that if men and women have equal qualifications, women should be favored for the position and that disabled should be favored over non-disabled people. This is typical for all positions in state and university service as of 2007, typically using the phrase "We try to increase diversity in this line of work". In recent years, there has been a long public debate about whether to issue programs that would grant women a privileged access to jobs in order to fight discrimination. Germany's Left Party brought up the discussion about affirmative action in Germany's school system. According to Stefan Zillich, quotas should be "a possibility" to help working class children who did not do well in school gain access to a Gymnasium (University-preparatory school). Headmasters of Gymnasien have objected, saying that this type of policy would "be a disservice" to poor children.

==== Norway ====
The boards of all public stock companies (ASA) in Norway should have at least 40% of either gender. This affects roughly 400 companies of over 300,000 in total. In their study of the effects of affirmative action on presence, prominence, and social capital of women directors in Norway, researchers Seierstad & Opsahl found that, when the affirmative action policy was first implemented, only 7 prominent directors were women and 84 were men. By August 2009, this had risen to 107 women compared to 117 men. The proportion of boards led by a woman remained low overall, but increased from 3.4% to 4.3%. By applying more restrictive definitions of prominence, the proportion of directors who were women generally increased. If only considering directors with at least three directorships, 61.4% of them were women. When considering directors with seven or more directorships, all of them were women. A 2016 study found no effect of the ASA representation requirement on either valuation or profits of the affected companies, and also no correlation between the requirement and the restructuring of companies away from ASA.

==== Romania ====
Romani people are allocated quotas for access to public schools and state universities.

==== Soviet Union and Russia ====
Soon after the 1918 revolution, Inessa Armand, Lenin's secretary and lover, was instrumental in creating Zhenotdel, which functioned until the 1930s as part of the international egalitarian and affirmative action movements. Quota systems existed in the USSR for various social groups including ethnic minorities, women and factory workers. Before 1934 ethnic minorities were described as culturally backward, but in 1934 this term was found inappropriate. In 1920s and early 1930s Korenizatsiia applied affirmative action to ethnic minorities. Quotas for access to university education, offices in the Soviet system and the Communist Party existed: for example, the position of First Secretary of a Soviet Republic's (or Autonomous Republic's) Party Committee was always filled by a representative of this republic's "titular ethnicity". Russia retains this system partially. Quotas are abolished, but preferences for some ethnic minorities and inhabitants of certain territories remain.

==== Serbia ====
The Constitution of the Republic of Serbia from 2006 established the principles of equality and the prohibition of discrimination on any grounds. It also allows affirmative action as "special measures" for certain marginalized groups, such as national minorities, by specifically excluding it from the legal definition of discrimination. The Roma national minority is enabled to enroll in public schools under more favorable conditions.

==== Slovakia ====
The Constitutional Court declared in October 2005 that affirmative action—i.e., "providing advantages for people of an ethnic or racial minority group"—was against its Constitution.

==== United Kingdom ====
In the United Kingdom, hiring someone simply because of their protected-group status, without regard to their performance, is illegal. By default, so is any other form of discrimination, quota or favouritism based on such "protected characteristics" in education, in employment, during commercial transactions, at private clubs or associations, and while using public services.

The Equality Act 2010 does allow for membership in a protected and disadvantaged group to be considered in hiring and promotion when the group is under-represented in a given area and if the candidates are of equal merit (in which case membership in a disadvantaged group can become a "tie-breaker"). Under Section 159 of the Equality Act 2010, an employer must "reasonably think that people with the protected characteristic suffer a disadvantage or are under-represented in that particular activity" and any positive action must be "a proportionate means of enabling or encouraging people to overcome the disadvantage or to take part in the activity". Specific exemptions include:

- As part of the Northern Ireland Peace Process, the Good Friday Agreement and the resulting Patten report, the Police Service of Northern Ireland are requires to recruit 50% of its numbers from the Catholic community and 50% from the Protestant and other communities, in order to reduce any possible bias towards Protestants. This was later referred to as the "50:50" measure.
- The Sex Discrimination (Election Candidates) Act 2002 allowed the use of all-women shortlists to select more women as election candidates.

In 2019, an employment tribunal found that "while positive action can be used to boost diversity, it should only be applied to distinguish between candidates who were all equally well qualified for a role".

=== North America ===
==== Canada ====
The equality section of the Canadian Charter of Rights and Freedoms explicitly permits affirmative action legislation, although the Charter does not require legislation that gives preferential treatment. Subsection 2 of Section 15 states that the equality provisions do "not preclude any law, program or activity that has as its object the amelioration of conditions of disadvantaged individuals or groups including those that are disadvantaged because of race, national or ethnic origin, colour, religion, sex, age or mental or physical disability".

The Canadian Employment Equity Act requires employers in federally-regulated industries to give preferential treatment to four designated groups: women, persons with disabilities, aboriginal peoples, and visible minorities. Less than one-third of Canadian Universities offer alternative admission requirements for students of aboriginal descent. Some provinces and territories also have affirmative action policies. For example, in the Northwest Territories in the Canadian north, aboriginal people are given preference for jobs and education and are considered to have P1 status. Non-aboriginal people who were born in the NWT or have resided half of their life there are considered a P2, as well as women and people with disabilities.

==== United States ====
The United States' policy of affirmative action dates to the Reconstruction Era in the United States. Current policy was introduced in the early 1960s in the United States, as a way to combat racial discrimination in the hiring process, with the concept later expanded to address gender discrimination. During this time, the legal and constitutional legitimacy of affirmative action has been the subject of several court cases.

Affirmative action was first created from Executive Order 10925, which was signed by President John F. Kennedy on 6 March 1961 and required that government employers "not discriminate against any employee or applicant for employment because of race, creed, color, or national origin" and "take affirmative action to ensure that applicants are employed and that employees are treated during employment, without regard to their race, creed, color, or national origin" but did not require or permit group preferences.

On 24 September 1965, President Lyndon B. Johnson signed Executive Order 11246, thereby replacing Executive Order 10925, but continued to use the same terminology that did not require or permit group preferences. Affirmative action was extended to sex by Executive Order 11375 which amended Executive Order 11246 on 13 October 1967, by adding "sex" to the list of protected categories. In the U.S., affirmative action's original purpose was to pressure institutions into compliance with the nondiscrimination mandate of the Civil Rights Act of 1964. The Civil Rights Acts do not cover discrimination based on veteran status, disabilities, or age that is 40 years and older. These groups may be protected from discrimination under different laws.

Some colleges use financial criteria to attract racial groups that have typically been under-represented and typically have lower living conditions. Some states such as California (California Civil Rights Initiative), Michigan (Michigan Civil Rights Initiative), and Washington (Initiative 200) have passed constitutional amendments banning public institutions, including public schools, from practicing affirmative action within their respective states.

Since the 1990s, conservative groups have increasingly suggested that college quotas have been used to illegally discriminate against people on the basis of race and have launched numerous lawsuits to stop them. In 2003, a Supreme Court decision regarding affirmative action in higher education (Grutter v. Bollinger, 539 US 244 – Supreme Court 2003) permitted educational institutions to consider race as a factor when admitting students. In 2014, the U.S. Supreme Court held that "States may choose to prohibit the consideration of racial preferences in governmental decisions". By that time, eight states (Oklahoma, New Hampshire, Arizona, Colorado, Nebraska, Michigan, Florida, Washington, and California) had already banned affirmative action. On 29 June 2023, the Supreme Court ruled 6–2 that the use of race in college admissions is unconstitutional under the Equal Protection Clause of the 14th Amendment in Students for Fair Admissions v. Harvard.

=== Oceania ===
==== New Zealand ====
Individuals of Māori or other Polynesian descent are often afforded improved access to university courses, or have scholarships earmarked specifically for them. Such access to university courses have in the past faced criticism, particularly at the University of Auckland due to a phenomenon known as mismatch theory. Accusations have been made of setting children up to fail due to a lack of transparency as to the preferred groups graduation rates and the university informing the students of such historical statistics dating back to the 1970s.

Affirmative action is provided for under section 73 of the Human Rights Act 1993 and section 19(2) of the New Zealand Bill of Rights Act 1990. Affirmative action in New Zealand is most often carried out indirectly by encouraging those in groups favored by affirmative action to get jobs in sectors they are underrepresented in. Diversity Awards NZ is an organization in New Zealand whose goal is to " celebrate excellence in workplace diversity, equity and inclusion."

Under section 73 of the Human Rights Act 1993, affirmative action would be permissible if:

1. Done in good faith;
2. For the purpose of assisting individuals or groups with a characteristic pertaining to a prohibited ground of discrimination; and
3. The individuals or groups in question need (or may reasonably be supposed to need) assistance in order to achieve an equal place with other members of the community.

=== South America ===
==== Brazil ====
Some Brazilian universities (state and federal) have created systems of preferred admissions (quotas) for racial minorities (Blacks and Amerindians), the poor and people with disabilities. There are also quotas of up to 20% of vacancies reserved for people with disabilities in the civil public services. The Democrats party, accusing the board of directors of the University of Brasília for "resurrecting Nazist ideals", appealed to the Supreme Federal Court against the constitutionality of the quotas the university reserves for minorities. The Supreme Court unanimously approved their constitutionality on 26 April 2012. Some universities have quotas for transgender, travesti and non-binary people, but without federal law requiring it.

== International organizations ==
=== United Nations ===
The International Convention on the Elimination of All Forms of Racial Discrimination stipulates (in Article 2.2) that affirmative action programs may be required of countries that ratified the convention, in order to rectify systematic discrimination. It states, however, that such programs "shall in no case entail as a consequence the maintenance of unequal or separate rights for different racial groups after the objectives for which they were taken have been achieved".

The United Nations Human Rights Committee states that "the principle of equality sometimes requires States parties to take affirmative action in order to diminish or eliminate conditions which cause or help to perpetuate discrimination prohibited by the Covenant. For example, in a State where the general conditions of a certain part of the population prevent or impair their enjoyment of human rights, the State should take specific action to correct those conditions. Such action may involve granting for a time to the part of the population concerned certain preferential treatment in specific matters as compared with the rest of the population. However, as long as such action is needed to correct discrimination, in fact, it is a case of legitimate differentiation under the Covenant."

== Responses ==
Proponents of affirmative action say it aims to promote societal equality through the preferential treatment of socioeconomically disadvantaged people. Often, these people are disadvantaged for historical reasons, such as oppression or slavery. Historically and internationally, support for affirmative action has sought to achieve a range of goals: bridging inequalities in employment and pay; increasing access to education; enriching state, institutional, and professional leadership with the full spectrum of society; redressing apparent past wrongs, harms, or hindrances, in particular addressing the apparent social imbalance left in the wake of slavery and slave laws. Critics of affirmative action have suggested that affirmative action hinders reconciliation, replaces old wrongs with new wrongs, undermines the achievements of minorities, and encourages individuals to identify themselves as disadvantaged, even if they are not. It may increase racial tension and benefit the more privileged people within minority groups at the expense of the least fortunate within majority groups.

A 2017 study of temporary federal affirmative action regulation in the United States estimated that the regulation "increases the black share of employees over time: in 5 years after an establishment is first regulated, the black share of employees increases by an average of 0.8 percentage points. Strikingly, the black share continues to grow at a similar pace even after an establishment is deregulated. The author argues that this persistence is driven in part by affirmative action inducing employers to improve their methods for screening potential hires."

Journalist Vann R. Newkirk II says that critics of affirmative action often claim court cases such as Fisher v. University of Texas, which held that colleges have some discretion to consider race when making admissions decisions, demonstrate that discrimination occurs in the name of affirmative action. He says this is one of several "misconceptions" often used to engender "white resentment" in opposition to affirmative action.

According to scholar George Sher, some critics of affirmative action say that it devalues the accomplishments of individuals chosen only based on the social groups to which they belong rather than their qualifications. Legal scholar Tseming Yang and others have discussed the challenges of fraudulent self-identification when implementing affirmative action policies. Yang suggests that because some individuals from non-preferred groups may designate themselves as members of preferred groups to access the benefits of such programs, this requires the "necessary evil" of verifying individuals' race to prevent this. Critics of affirmative action also suggest that programs may benefit the members of the targeted group that least need the benefit—that is, those who have the greatest social, economic and educational advantages within the targeted group—or may lead the beneficiaries of affirmative action to conclude that it is unnecessary to work as hard, and those who do not benefit may perceive hard work as futile. Political scientist Charles Murray has said that beneficiaries are often wholly unqualified for the opportunity made available, citing his belief in the innate differences between races. He reaffirmed these views in his essay "The Advantages of Social Apartheid", in which he advocates separation of people based on race and intelligence.

=== Mismatching ===
Mismatching is the proposed negative effect affirmative action has when it places a student into a college that is too difficult for them based on meeting quotas, which may increase the chance they drop out or fail the course, thus hurting the intended beneficiaries of affirmative action. According to this theory, in the absence of affirmative action, a student may be admitted to a college that matches their academic ability and therefore has a better chance of graduating.

In 2017, researcher Andrew J. Hill found that affirmative action bans resulted in a reduction in minority students completing four-year STEM degrees, and suggests this indicates that the mismatch hypothesis is unfounded. He says this is evidence that affirmative action may be effective in "some circumstances", such as in encouraging greater minority engagement in STEM degrees. In 2020, researcher Zachary Bleemer found that an affirmative action ban in California (Prop 209) had resulted in average wage drops of 5% annually among underrepresented minorities aged 24–34 in STEM industries, especially effecting Hispanic people.

In 2007, Gail Heriot, a professor of law at the University of San Diego and a member of the U.S. Commission on Civil Rights, discussed the evidence in support of mismatching in law courses. She pointed to a study by Richard Sander which suggests there were 7.9% fewer Black attorneys than if there had been no affirmative action. Sander suggests that mismatching meant Black students were more likely to drop out of law school and fail bar exams. Sander's paper on mismatching has been criticized by several law professors, including Ian Ayres and Richard Brooks from Yale, who argue that eliminating affirmative action would actually reduce the number of Black lawyers by 12.7%. Furthermore, they suggest that students attending higher ranking colleges do better than those who don't. A 2008 study by Jesse Rothstein and Albert H. Yoon said Sander's results were "plausible", but said that eliminating affirmative action would "lead to a 63 percent decline in black matriculants at all law schools and a 90 percent decline at elite law schools". They dismissed the mismatch theory, concluding that "one cannot credibly invoke mismatch effects to argue that there are no benefits" to affirmative action. In a 2016 review of previous studies by Peter Arcidiacono and Michael Lovenheim, they suggested that more African-American students attending less-selective schools would significantly improve first-attempt pass rates at the state bar, but cautioned that such improvements could be outweighed by decreases in law school attendance.

A 2011 study of data held by Duke University said there was no evidence of mismatch, and proposed that mismatch could only occur if a selective school possessed private information about students' prospects at the college which it failed to share. Providing such information to prospective students would avoid mismatch because the students could choose another school that was a better match. A 2016 study on affirmative action in India said there was no evidence for the mismatching hypothesis.

=== Polls ===
According to a poll taken by USA Today in 2005, the majority of Americans supported affirmative action for women, while views on minority groups were more split. Men are only slightly more likely to support affirmative action for women, though a majority of both do. However, a slight majority of Americans do believe that affirmative action goes beyond ensuring access and goes into the realm of preferential treatment. Also in 2005, a Gallup poll showed that 72% of black Americans and 44% of white Americans supported racial affirmative action (with 21% and 49% opposing), with support and opposition among Hispanic people falling between those of black people and white people. Support among black people, unlike among white people, had almost no correlation with political affiliation.

A Quinnipiac poll from June 2009 found that 55% of Americans felt that affirmative action, in general, should be discontinued, though 55% supported it for people with disabilities. The Quinnipiac University Polling Institute survey found 65% of American voters opposed the application of affirmative action to homosexuals, with 27% indicating they supported it.

A Leger poll taken in 2010 found 59% of Canadians opposed considering race, gender, or ethnicity when hiring for government jobs.

A 2014 Pew Research Center poll found that 63% of Americans thought affirmative action programs aimed at increasing minority representation on college campuses were "a good thing", compared to 30% who thought they were "a bad thing". The following year, Gallup released a poll showing that 67% of Americans supported affirmative action programs aimed at increasing female representation, compared to 58% who supported such programs aimed at increasing the representation of racial minorities.

A 2019 Pew Research Center poll found 73% of Americans believe race or ethnicity should not factor into college admissions decisions. A few years later in 2022, a Pew Research Center poll found that 74% of Americans believe race or ethnicity should not factor into college admissions decisions.

== See also ==
- Achievement gap in the United States
- Affirmative action bake sale
- Anti-discrimination law
- Anti-racism
- Coate–Loury model
- Civil and political rights
- Civil liberties
- History of civil rights in the United States
  - Civil rights movement
- Disability rights movement
- Discrimination in the United States
  - Racism in the United States
  - Religious discrimination in the United States
- Diversity, equity, and inclusion, the successor policy which replaced Affirmative Action
  - Diversity (business)
  - Diversity training
- Economic discrimination
- Equal opportunity
- Ethnic penalty
- Gender equality
  - Women's rights
- Legacy preferences
- Men's rights movement
- Minority rights
- Multiculturalism
- Multiracialism
- Political correctness
- Positive liberty
- Progressive stack
- Race and intelligence
- Racial gerrymandering
- Reasonable accommodation
- Reverse racism
- Special measures for gender equality in the United Nations
- Strong-basis-in-evidence standard
- Social justice
- Substantive equality
- Tokenism
- White backlash
  - Angry white male
- White guilt
  - Reparations for slavery
