= Hanfu Movement =

Revival movement of traditional Chinese garments

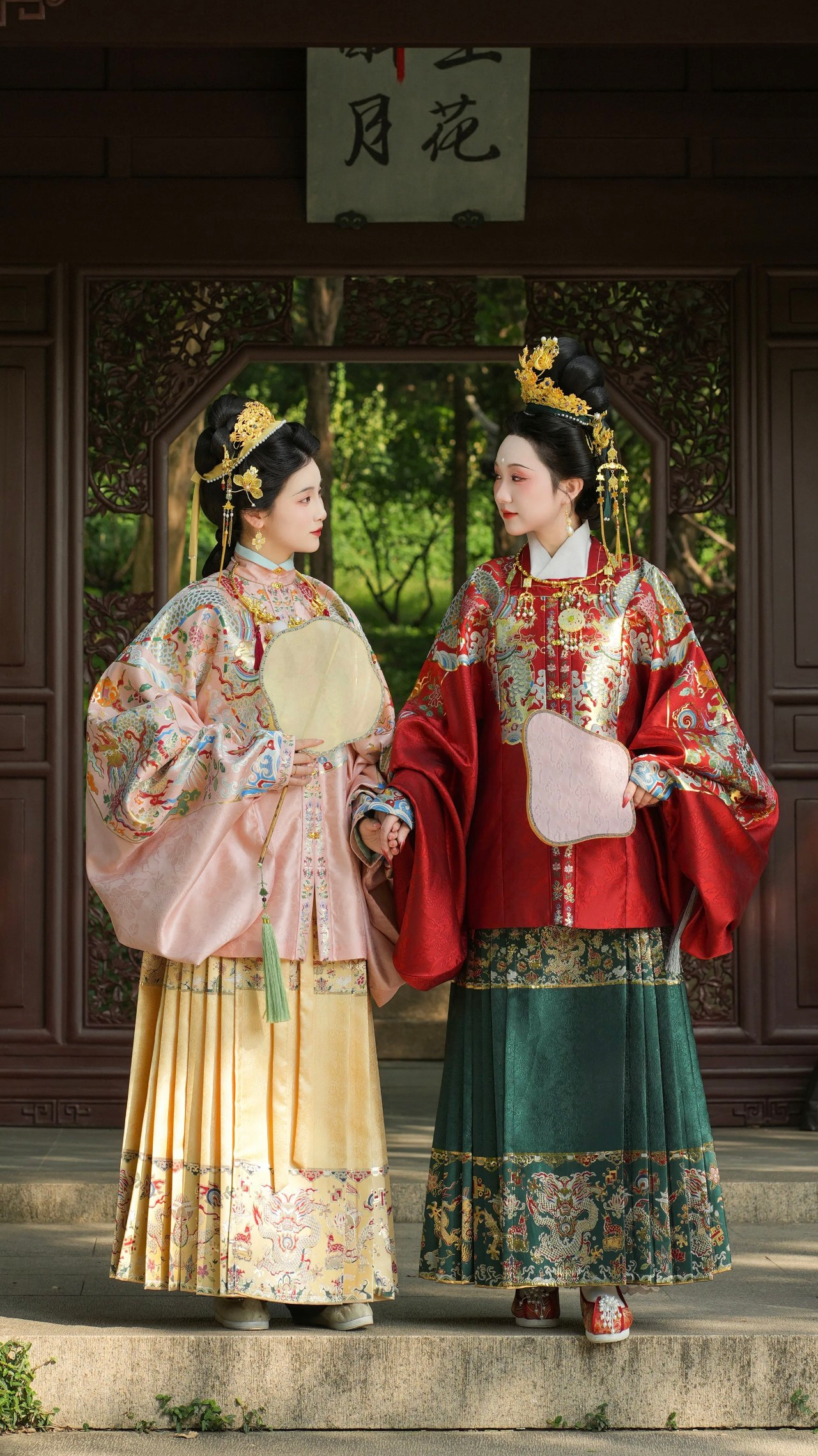
- Modern parallel-collar ao and mamianqun based on the hanfu of Ming Empress Xiaoduanxian
- Simplified Chinese: 汉服运动
- Traditional Chinese: 漢服運動
- Literal meaning: "Han clothing movement"
Transcriptions
Standard Mandarin
- Hanyu Pinyin: Hànfú yùndòng

The Hanfu Movement (simplified Chinese: 汉服运动; traditional Chinese: 漢服運動; pinyin: Hànfú yùndòng), also known as the Hanfu Revival Movement (汉服复兴运动; 漢服復興運動; Hànfú fùxīng yùndòng), is a homegrown, grassroots cultural movement in China seeking to revive or revitalize Han Chinese fashion, aesthetics and cultural identity via public wearing of pre-Qing dynasty traditional ethnic clothing of the Han Chinese, i.e. hanfu. The movement began as a subculture of nostalgic pastime among elegance-seeking, historically conscious netizens, and has since evolved into a trendy nationwide movement boasting a new clothing industry with millions of young fashion-conscious consumers. It has also slowly gained traction amongst the Chinese diaspora, especially in countries like Singapore. As of 2025, the hanfu market in mainland China is worth over 20 billion yuan with over 7,000 businesses.

The Hanfu movement started in 2003, and its emergence can be credited to Zhang Congxing, a Singaporean Chinese who wrote an article about Wang Letian, a Zhengzhou man who was photographed dressed in a homemade shenyi, a type of robe often worn as Confucian academic dress. This spurred online discussion and spontaneous acts of imitation, culminating in the formation of a rapid-growing organic movement. Its ready adoption by trendy fashion-conscious young women has been accelerated by social media, which then were predominantly online forums, has helped to propagate the trend via photo sharing, traditional clothing design comparisons, cosplaying, and historical and philosophical discussions. Later online platforms such as Bilibili, Instagram and Douyin have further contributed to its resurgence by allowing youth to showcase and easily share their dress fittings and experience. The popular clothing styles are typically ceremonial attires worn by royalty and aristocrats, scholar-officials and soldiers, although there have been calls to promote more commoners' clothing that are more compatible with work, sports and modern daily life.

The popularity of the movement, especially among Gen Y and Gen Z, can be attributed to a burgeoning national pride associated with the rise of China as an economic, technological and military powerhouse in the world stage, to draw historical sustenance and justification for national rejuvenation, and to express subtle support for Han nationalism and discontent against affirmative action and legal leniency favoring ethnic minorities (which Han nationalists view as a form of reverse discrimination). Additionally, the aesthetics of traditional Han garments is considered a more authentic representation of Chinese culture and history than the qipao and tangzhuang then-promoted by the Chinese Ministry of Culture and the Chinese television industry, as those are Manchu-influenced clothings that are considered historical products of violent forced assimilation during the 17th century conquest by the Qing dynasty and are often also seen as being associated with the century of humiliation. It can also be seen as a nationalistic salute to the Chinese Dream by paying homage to past golden ages of Pax Sinica, when Chinese culture, aesthetics and philosophy had significant influences over the surrounding regions.

Youth in Hanfu

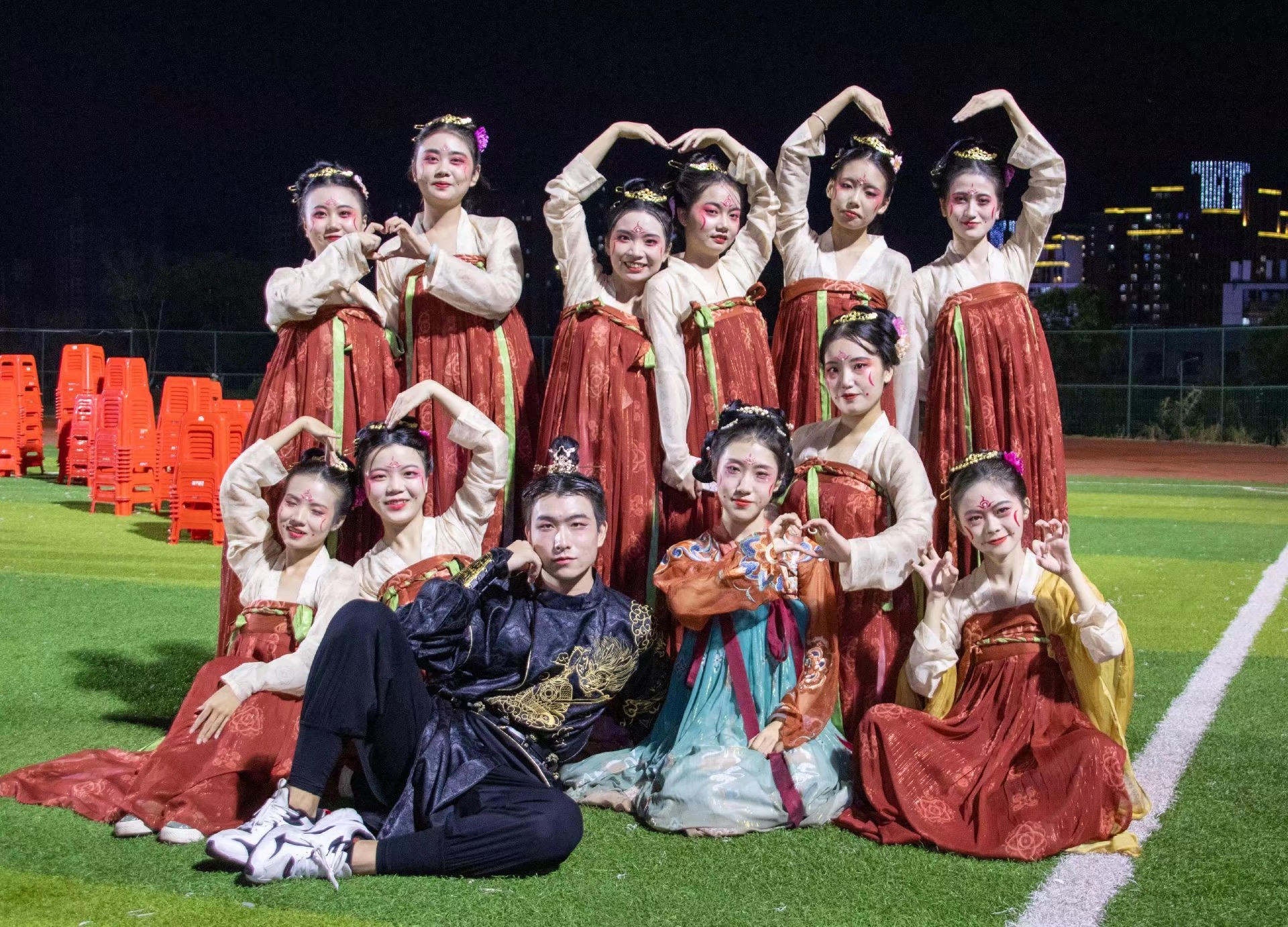
School pupils in Hanfu

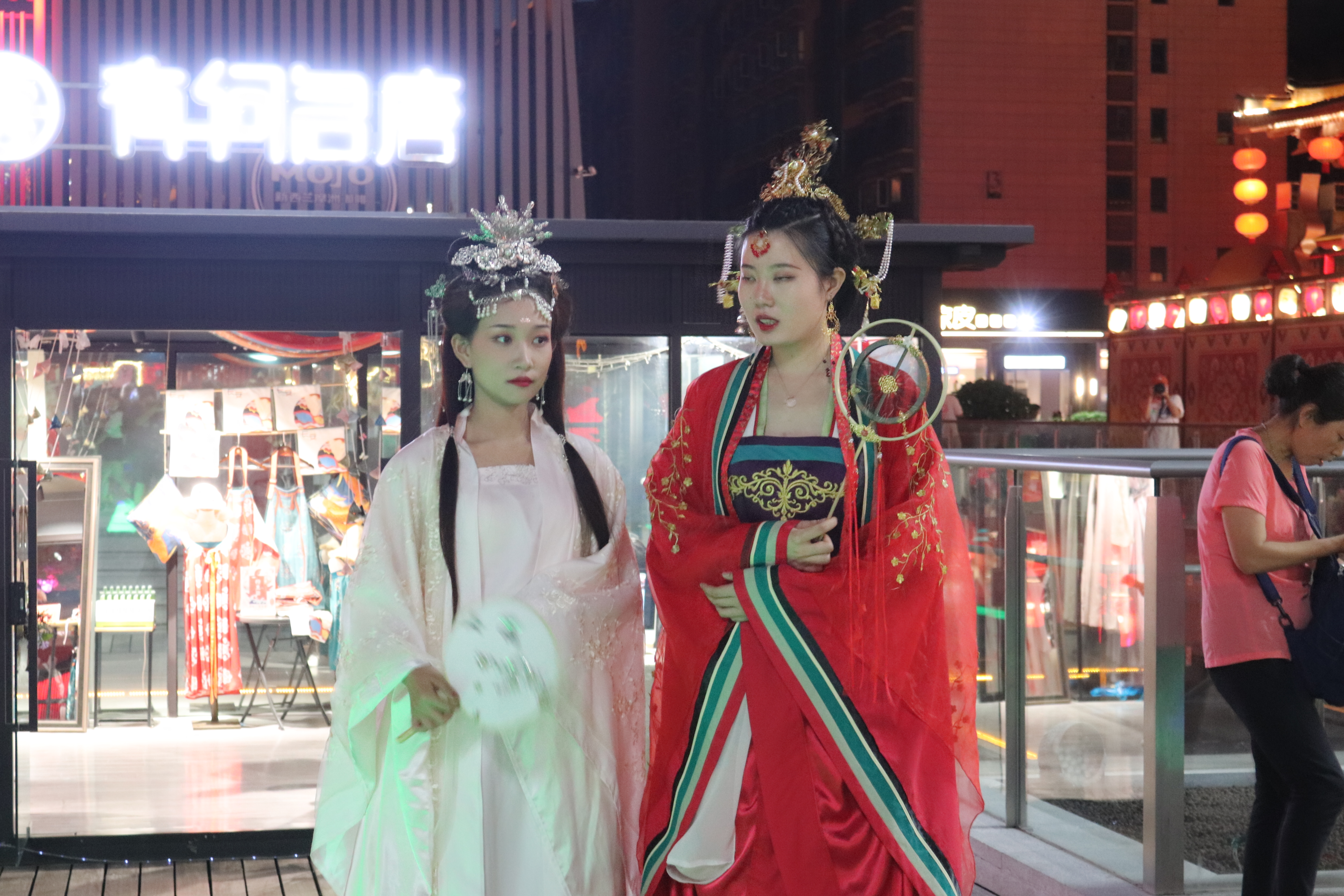
Night wear of Hanfu

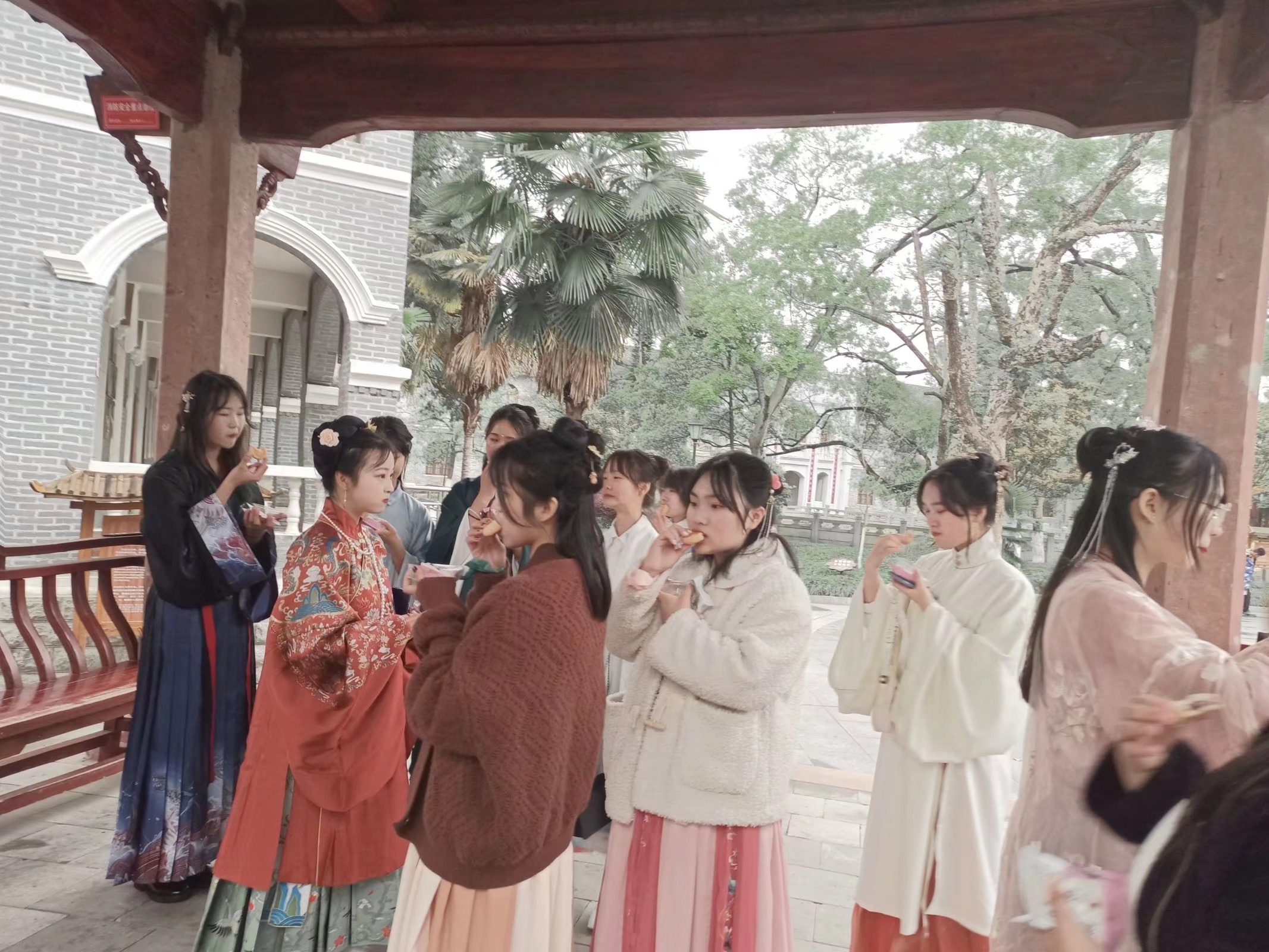
People in Hanfu during Flower Festival (花朝節).

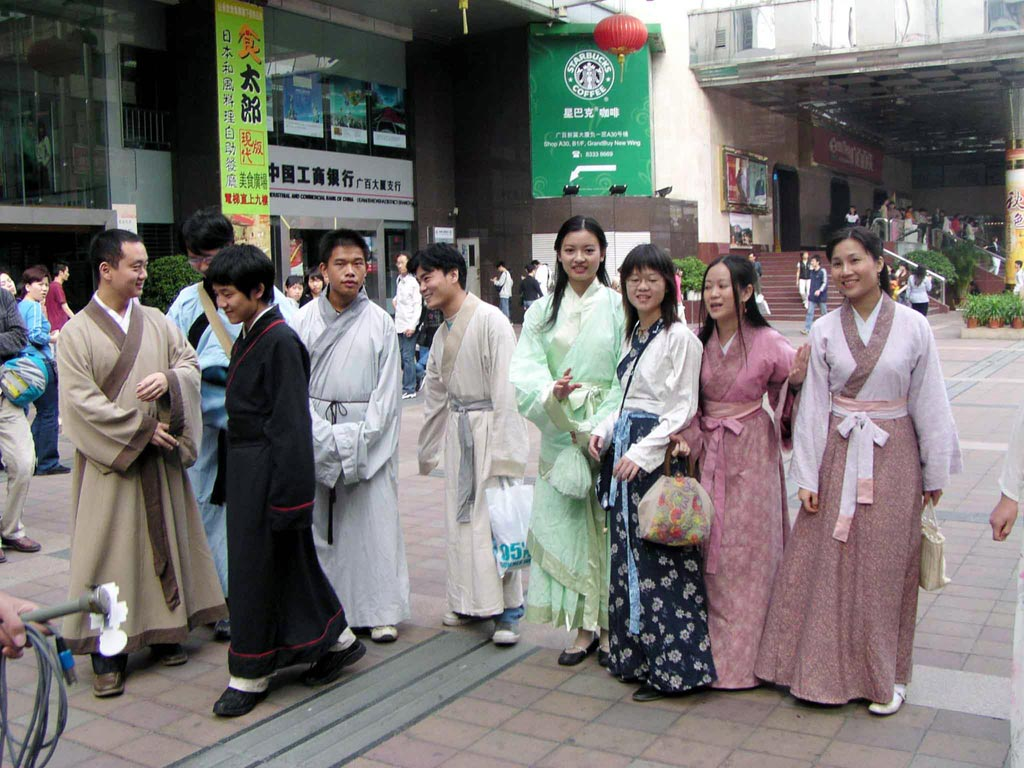
Hanfu street fashion

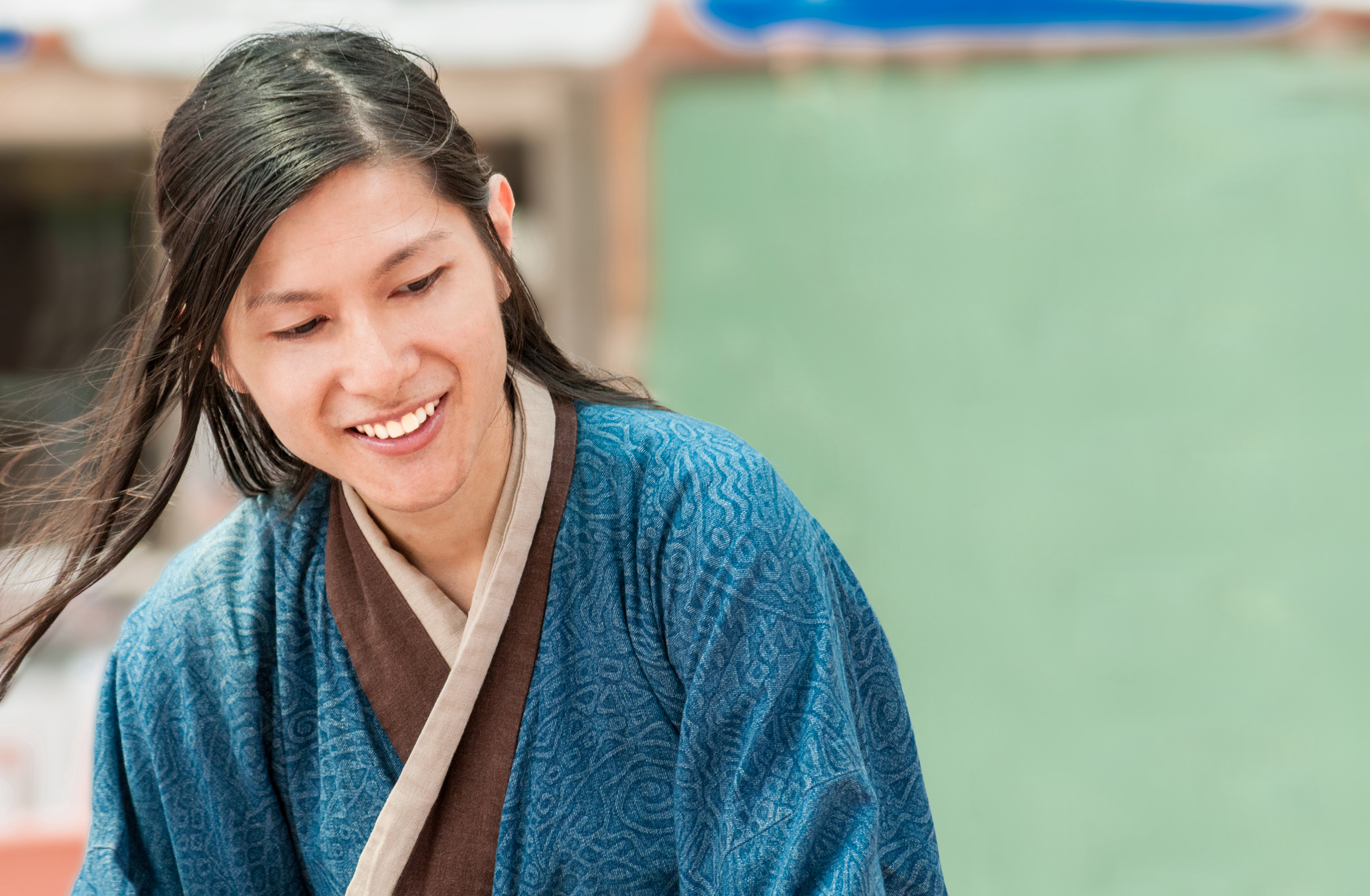
Young man in Hanfu

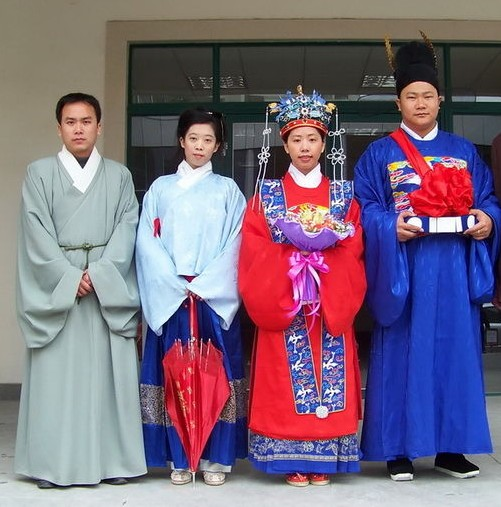
Couple in wedding Hanfu.

== Appeal ==
The desire to reconnect with one's cultural heritage has not been the only driver of the movement. Hanfu's classical elegance drive the movement's popularity, particularly on social media.

Women have also been the principal drivers of the Hanfu Movement by emphasizing its fashionable aspect. According to the iMedia 2018 survey, women accounted for 88.2% of hanfu enthusiasts, and 75.8% of hanfu stores on the Taobao and Tmall platforms sold products exclusively for women.

== Cultural significance, ethical-ritual aspects, and social value ==
Chinese culture accords great significance to ritual and the power of symbols. The key design elements of Hanfu are no exception. In the ritual tradition originating in the Zhou dynasty:

1. The left collar covering the right represents the perfection of human nature through culture and the overcoming of instinct and bodily forces by the spiritual power of ethical and ritual teaching;
2. The expansive cutting and board sleeve represents the concord or harmony between nature and human creative power.
3. The use of the girdle to fasten the garment over the body represents the constraints of Han culture to limit human desire, which would otherwise lead to the commission of immoral acts

Proponents of the movement emphasize the symbolic value of Hanfu and the ethical and ritual significance of its all its aspects.

They also note that China, in the face of rising prosperity and modern social pressures, an increasing need to fashion a sense of national identity. On this view, the Hanfu Movement is a natural and intrinsic part of the Chinese Dream - "the Great Rejuvenation of the Chinese Nation" and seeks to recover lost cultural heritage as well as to promote traditional Chinese culture.

== Definition of Hanfu ==
=== Classical usage of the word "Hanfu" and historical records ===
According to Dictionary of Old Chinese Clothing (Chinese: 中國衣冠服飾大辭典), the term hanfu literally means "Clothing of the Han People." This term, which is not commonly used in ancient times, can be found in some historical records from Han, Tang, Song, Ming, Qing dynasties and the Republican era in China.

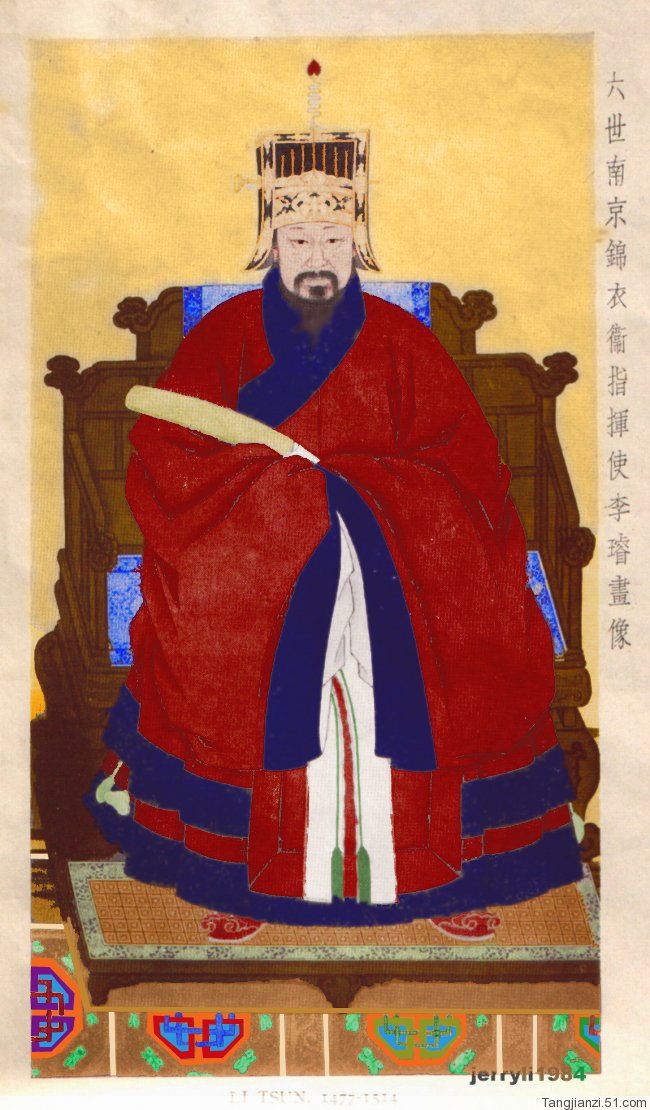
Ming dynasty official dress

Modern expert opinion

Chinese researcher Hua Mei (Chinese: 華梅), interviewed by student advocates of the Hanfu Movement in 2007, recognizes that defining hanfu is no simple matter, as there was no uniform style of Chinese fashion throughout the millennia of its history. Because of its constant evolution, she questions which period's style can rightly be regarded as traditional. Nonetheless, she explains that hanfu has historically been used to broadly refer to indigenous Chinese clothing in general. Observing that the apparel most often promoted by the movement are based on the Han-era quju and zhiju, she suggests that other styles, especially that of the Tang era, would also be candidates for revival in light of this umbrella definition.

Zhou Xing (Chinese: 周星), cultural anthropologist and professor at Aichi University, states that the term hanfu was not commonly used in ancient times and referred to some of the costumes worn by Hanfu Movement participants as being historically inaccurate because they contain modern design elements. Like Hua, he noted that the term hanfu classically referred to the clothing worn by Han people in general, but he argued that there are differences between historical hanfu and the contemporary hanfu introduced by some participants of the movement.

Consensus view and popular opinion

On March 8, 2021, the magazine Vogue published an article on modern hanfu defining it as a "type of dress from any era when Han Chinese ruled".

Enthusiasts in the Hanfu movement have reached their own consensus as to what would qualify as legitimate hanfu. These include a wide and loose style of cross-collar garments with the right lapel covering the left, the use of a flat cutting, and the employment of belts and lace as closures in place of buttons. They acknowledge that the hanfu costumes in some photo studios, movies, and TV dramas are not authentic representations of ancient hanfu, but contemporary hanfu modified based on ancient hanfu for the purposes of visual effects, cost saving and convenience of wearing.

== Movement Timeline ==
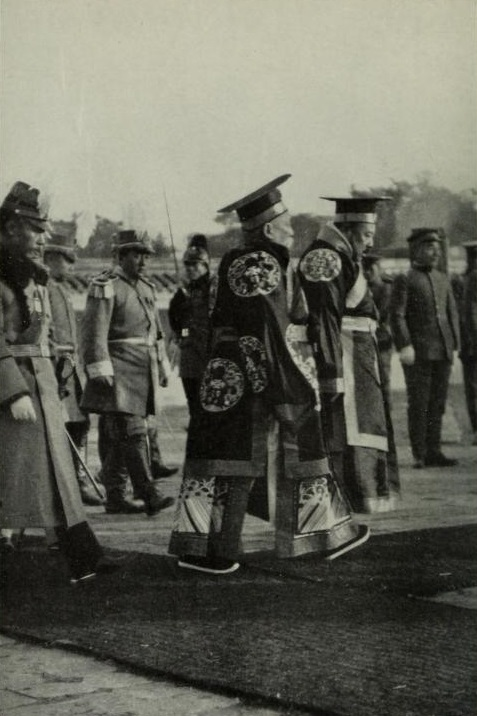
The Hongxian Emperor wearing mianfu on his coronation ceremony, 1915

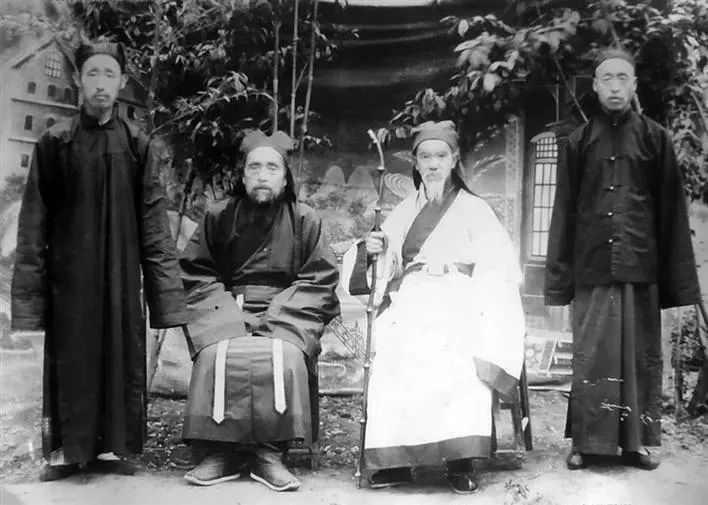
Photograph of late Qing dynasty Confucian scholar Niu Zhaolian (third from the left), wearing hanfu.

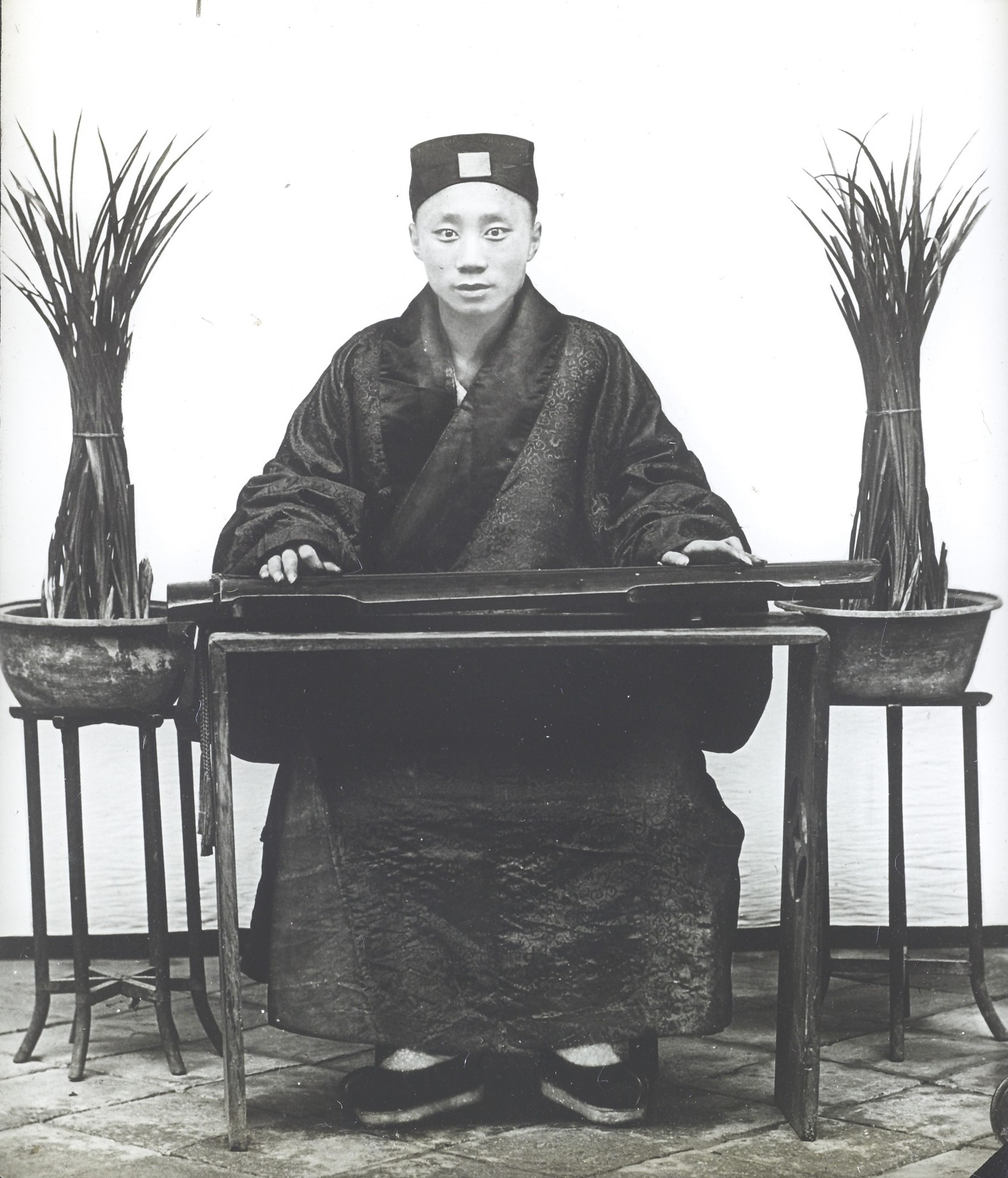
Upper-class Man wearing traditional daopao, 1906–1912.

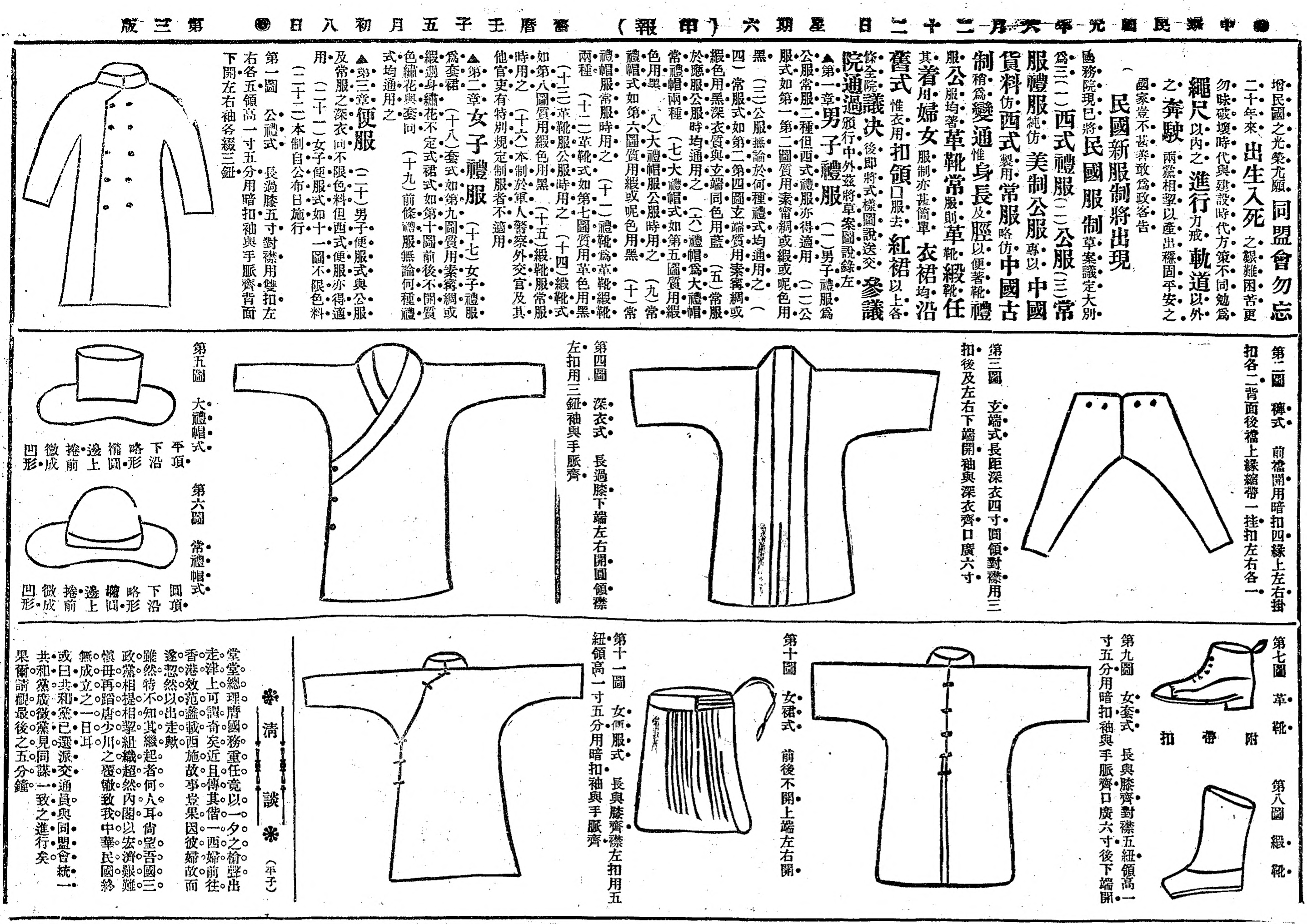
Newspaper announcement for new national official attire, including clothing based on shenyi and xuanduan, from Shenbao (申報) 1912.06.22

=== Precursors ===
There were numerous attempts to reintroduce Han Chinese clothing immediately after the fall of the Qing and in the revolutionary period.

After the Qing was toppled in the 1911 Xinhai Revolution, the Taoist dress and topknot was adopted by the ordinary gentry and "Society for Restoring Ancient Ways" (復古會) on the Sichuan and Hubei border where the White Lotus and Gelaohui operated.

Traditional Han Chinese dress was also employed by the short-reigning Hongxian Emperor, former President Yuan Shikai, during his coronation ceremony in 1915, and his fall resulted in the fail of Hanfu Movement in ROC in the 20th century.

=== 2000s ===
==== First seeds ====
Journalists and scholars agree that the modern Hanfu Movement begun around 2003. In November 2003, Wang Letian from Zhengzhou, China, wore in public a homemade shenyi (a kind of Hanfu), thus catching the attention of Singaporean-Chinese journalist Zhang Congxing, who then decided to write an article on him which was published on the Lianhe Zaobao, a Singapore newspaper.

This inspired others to reflect on the cultural identity of Han Chinese and to initiate the Hanfu Movement as part of a broader effort to stimulate a cultural renaissance. Adoption was rapid - in the same year, people started wearing hanfu in public, forming communities of Hanfu enthusiasts and organizing activities related to hanfu and other elements of traditional Chinese culture. The movement had significant online support. Proponents of Hanfu launched the website Hanwang (Chinese: 漢網) to promote "traditional Han clothing".

==== Practical difficulties ====
In the early years of the Hanfu Movement, there were no existing stores from which to purchase hanfu. The first manufacturers and sellers of hanfu were the early hanfu enthusiasts who possessed the necessary skills to DIY hanfu by themselves. They made hanfu in small quantities, and mainly relied on hanfu forums and enthusiasts communities to advertise their products. Around the year 2005, the first online hanfu store appeared. Since then, more and more hanfu stores emerged both online and offline. In 2006, the first physical hanfu store was opened under the trademark Chong Hui Han Tang (重回漢唐), which literally means "Coming back to the Han and Tang Dynasties" in Chengdu, Sichuan province of China. From the year 2007, various hanfu-related clubs started to appear. These clubs focused on to organizing offline social activities in the instead of being largely online based.

Other difficulties were psychological and included shyness. Many users reported having first to overcome the fear of social derision before daring to wear hanfu in public.

==== Politics ====
In 2007, a member of the CPPCC, Ye Hongming, proposed to define hanfu as the national uniform. In the same year, a proposal to change the current western style academic dress to hanfu style was also made by Liu Minghua, a deputy of the National People's congress. In February 2007, advocates of hanfu submitted a proposal to the Chinese Olympic Committee to have it be the official clothing of the Chinese team in the 2008 Summer Olympics. However, the Chinese Olympic Committee rejected the proposal in April 2007.

=== 2010s ===
Culture shows and penetration into the mainstream

In 2013, the first Xitang Hanfu Culture Week was held in the city of Xitang, Zhejiang province. Since then, it has been held successfully in subsequent years and is continue to be held annually. In 2014, a project called Travelling with Hanfu was launched through the collaboration between Chinese photographer and freelancer Dang Xiaoshi, and Chinese actor Xu Jiao. Together, they posted series of photos online which quickly attracted many public attention.

Market growth

In 2018, it was estimated that the hanfu market consisted of 2 million potential consumers. The estimated revenue sales for 2019 was 1.4 billion yuan ($199.3 million).

In 2019, it was estimated that there were 1,188 online hanfu stores on Tmall and Taobao which shows an increase of 45.77% over the previous year. The hanfu stores Chong Hui Han Tang ranked third on Tmall in 2019, after the stores Hanshang Hualian and Shisanyu. In the 2019 edition of the Xitang Hanfu Culture Week, it was estimated that it attracted 40,000 hanfu enthusiast participants.

=== 2020s ===
Continued growth

By 2020, according to a study done by Forward Industry Research Institute (a Chinese research institute), the number of hanfu enthusiasts in China has reached 5.163 million, creating a market size equivalent to 6.36 billion yuan (US$980 million), a proportional increase of over 40% compared to the previous year.

In 2021, a lawmaker named Cheng Xinxiang submitted a proposal for a National Hanfu Day. This would take place on the Double Third Festival, or the third day of the third month on the Chinese Calendar. Meanwhile, it is projected that by the end of 2021, the total number of hanfu enthusiasts across China will exceed 7 million, and that the market size of hanfu will exceed nine billion yuan (US$1.39 billion).

== Historical background and context ==
=== Han clothing before the Qing conquest ===
The traditional form of Han Chinese clothing changed drastically during the Manchu-led Qing dynasty. When the Manchus established the Qing dynasty, there were three Manchu cultural impositions which were placed upon the Han people: the queue hairstyle which was universally and strictly implemented, the wearing of Manchu-style clothing in official dress and the learning of Manchu language. Although the implementation of the latter two was more limited in both scope, traditional features of Han Chinese attire, found in all earlier dynasties, disappeared nearly completely from public life.

Han Chinese clothing before the Qing

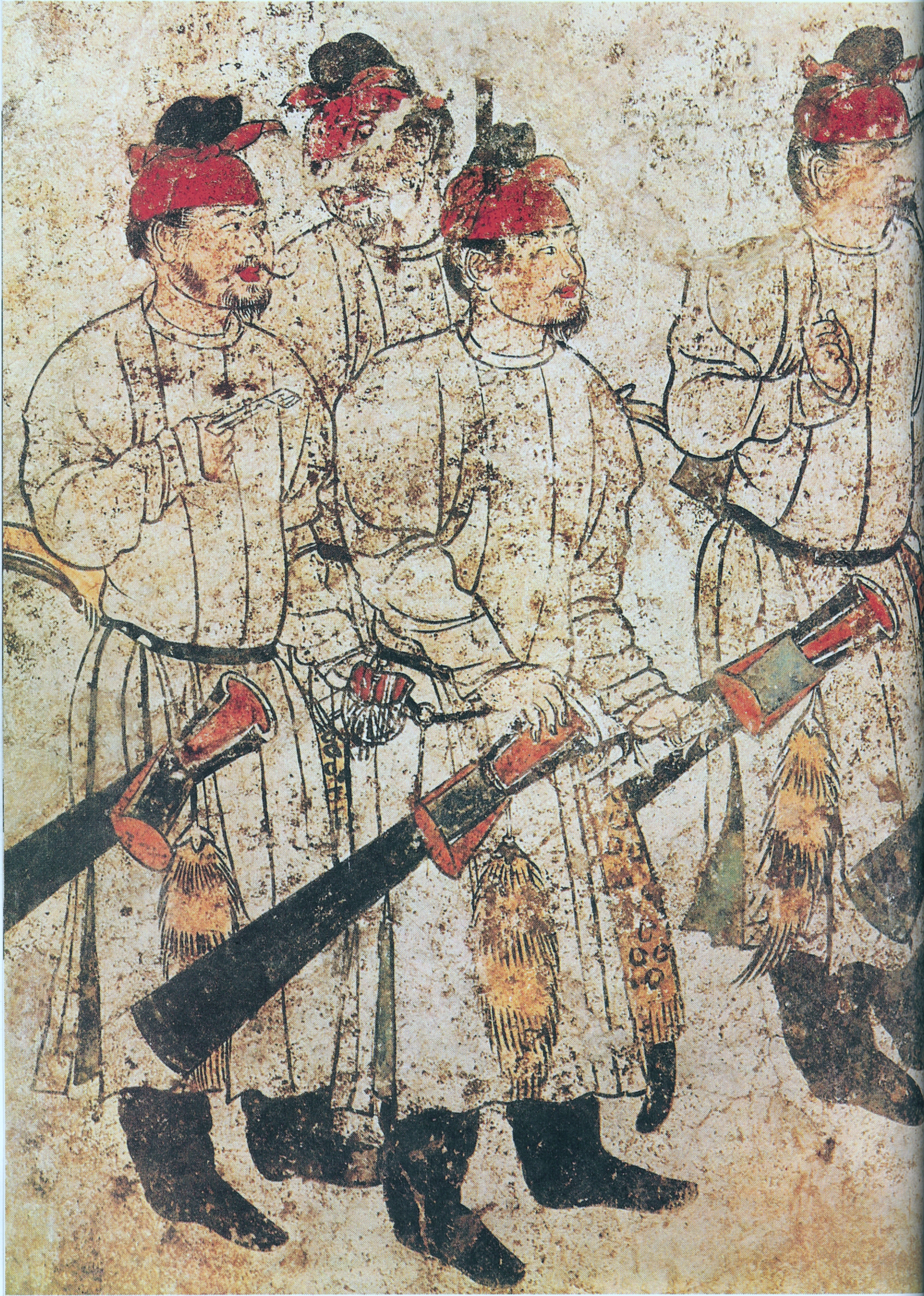
Tang dynasty military attire

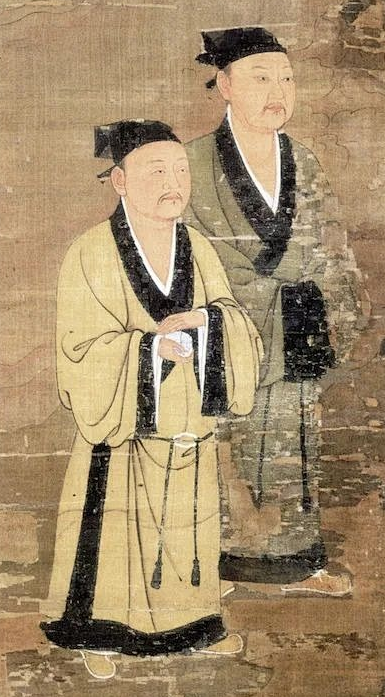
Song dynasty scholars.

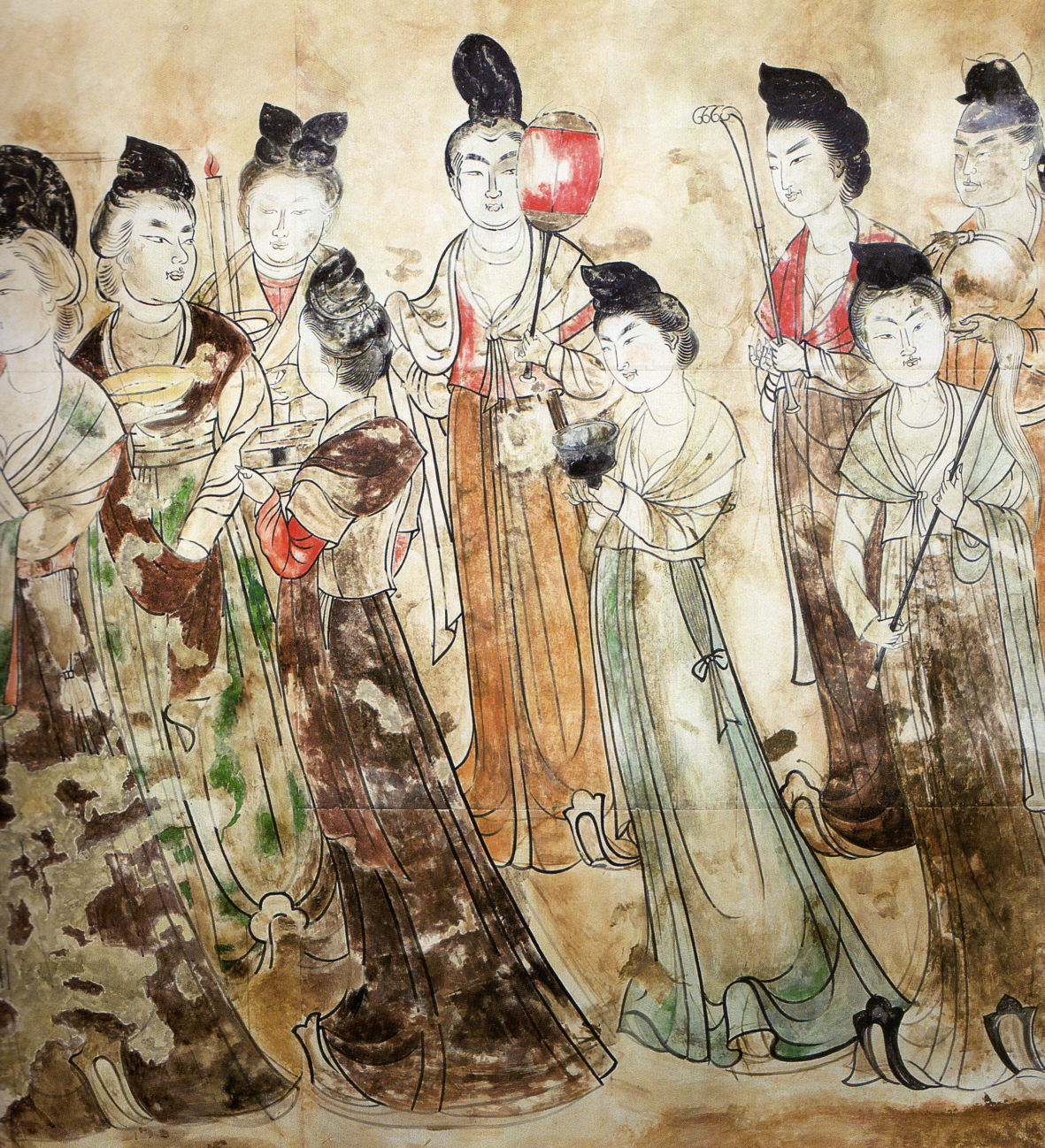
Tang dynasty court ladies

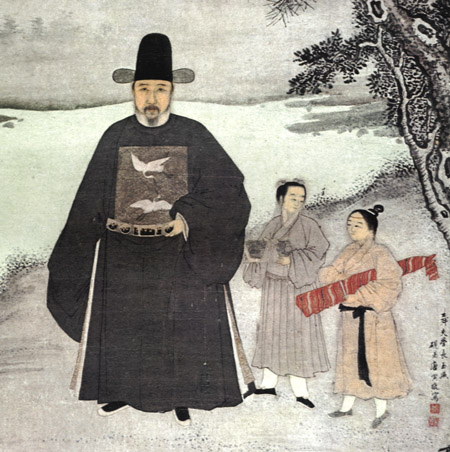
Ming dynasty official dress

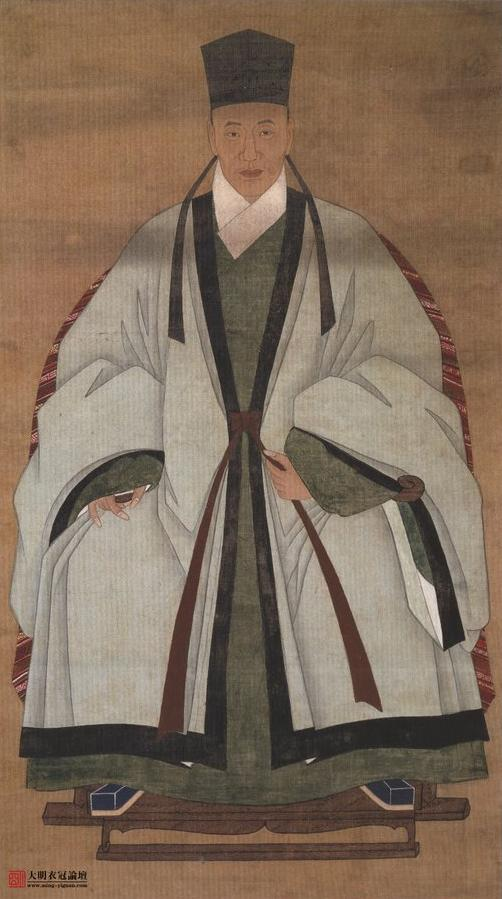
Ming dynasty man scholar.

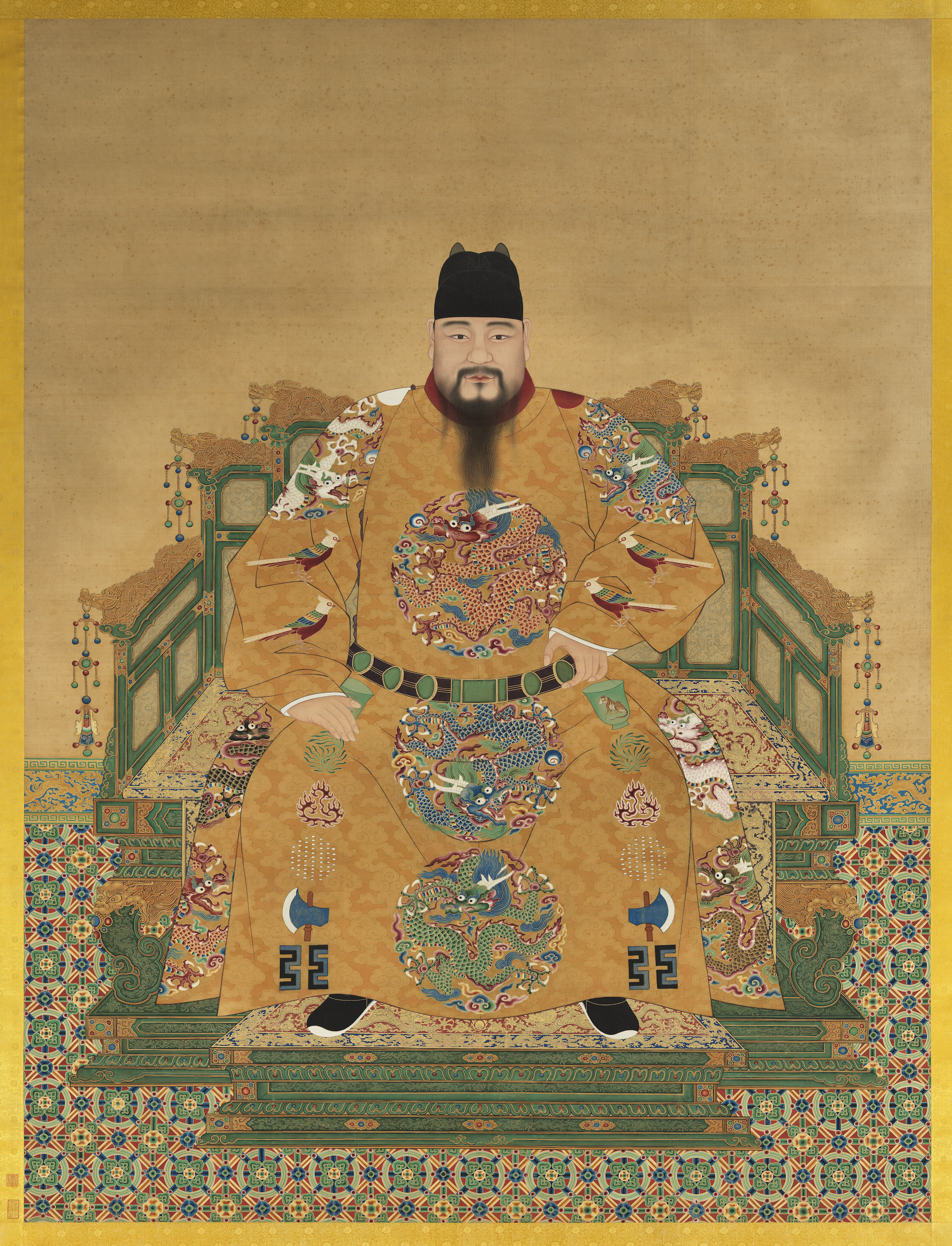
Ming dynasty imperial dress

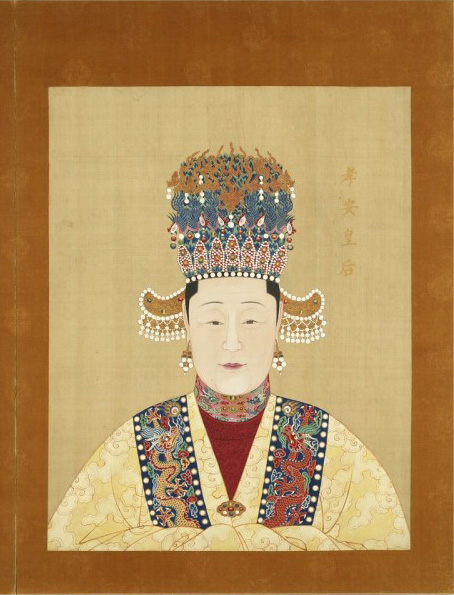
Ming dynasty imperial dress

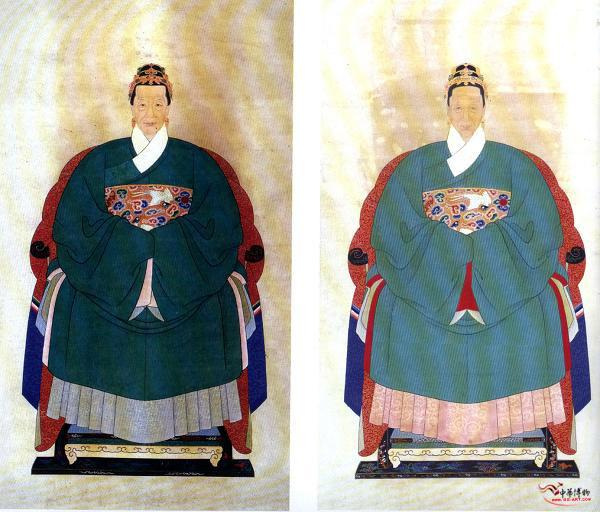
Ming dynasty noble women.

Against this context, the Hanfu Movement is a grassroots movement which seeks to restore the dress and attire and to recover the aesthetic sensibilities of Han Chinese dress from previous eras recognized as high points for Han culture - principally the Ming, Tang, Song and Han. It seeks to popularize hanfu as fashionable daily wear, and to integrate traditional Han elements into the design of modern clothing. There is also a clear social and communal aspect to the movement. Participants and supporters of the Hanfu Movement call one another tongpao (同袍); a term, which comes from the Shijing:

How shall it be said that you have no clothes? I will share my long robes with you. [豈曰無衣、與子同袍。] When the king is raising his forces, I will prepare my lance and spear and be your comrade. [王于興師、脩我戈矛、與子同仇。]

— 《無衣 - Wu Yi》, Shijing, Odes of Qin

The term tongpao is literally translated as "wearing the same style of robe" and is also a pun of tongbao (同胞) meaning "fellow compatriots".

=== The Tifayifu policy ===
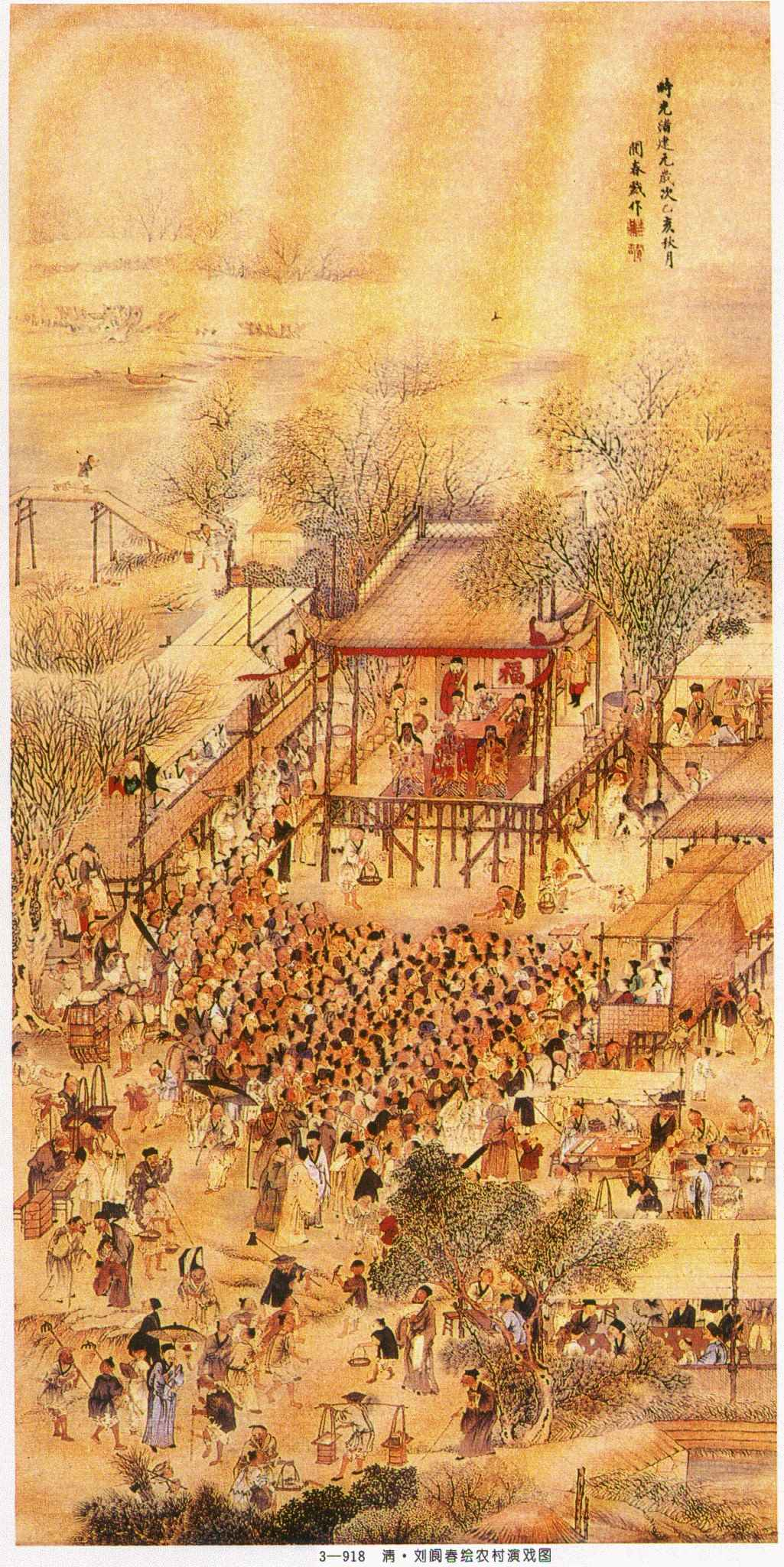
People wearing hanfu in the early years of Qing dynasty

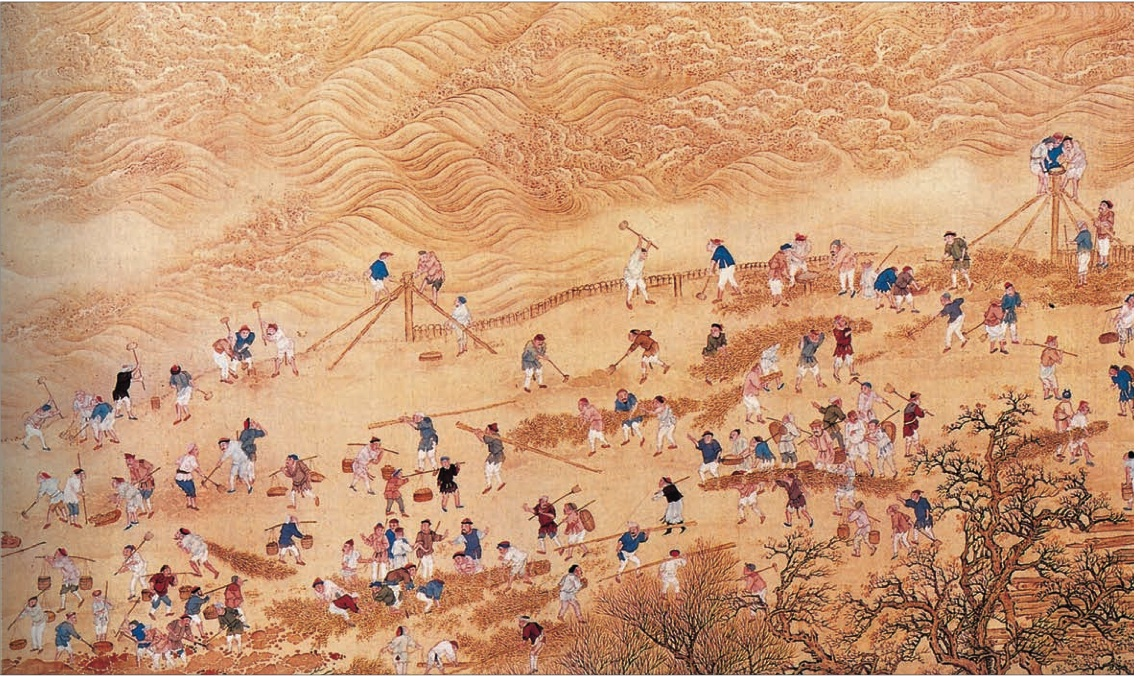
Han and Manchu clothing coexisted during the early years of Qing dynasty

Upon establishing the Qing dynasty, the Manchu authorities also issued a decree known as Tifayifu (剃髮易服, lit. 'shaving hair and changing apparel'), forcing all male citizens to adopt Manchu hairstyle by shaving their hair on the front of the head and braiding the hair on the back of the head into pigtails known as queue (辮子), as well as to adopt Manchu clothing such as changshan (長衫). Those who violated the Tifayifu policy were heavy punished, sometimes with death. This policy caused significant discontentment among other ethnicities, including the Han Chinese, and provoked numerous uprisings across the country. However, those uprisings were violently suppressed.

Qing Manchu prince Dorgon initially canceled the order to shave for all men in Ming territories south of the Great wall (post 1644 additions to the Qing). Ironically, it was Han officials from Shandong, Sun Zhixie and Li Ruolin who, in obsequious displays of loyalty to the new political order, had voluntarily shaved their foreheads and then demanded Qing Prince Dorgon impose the queue hairstyle on the entire population.

=== Exemptions - women, children and clergy ===
Certain groups of people were exempted from the Tifayifu, including women, children, and clerics. Throughout the Qing dynasty, Han Chinese women continued to wear the styles of clothing from the Ming dynasty. Neither Taoist priests nor Buddhist monks were required to wear the queue by the Qing or to change their attire. They continued to wear their traditional hairstyles: completely shaved heads for Buddhist monks, and long hair bound in the traditional Chinese topknot for Taoist priests. Their garments were unchanged. Taoist priests continued to wear daopao, the traditional Taoist robes.

=== Impact on male non-Han subjects ===
The policy had precedent. The Qing imposed the shaved head hairstyle on men of all ethnicities under its rule even before 1644 like upon the Nanai people in the 1630s who had to shave their foreheads. The men of certain ethnicities who came under Qing rule later like Salar people and Uyghur people already shaved all their heads bald so the shaving order was redundant. However, the shaving policy was not enforced in the Tusi autonomous chiefdoms in Southwestern China where many minorities lived, and on one Han Chinese Tusi, the Chiefdom of Kokang populated by Han Kokang people.

=== Resistance to the Tifayifu ===
From the earliest years, the Tifayifu policy was encountered with strong objection from the Han Chinese, whose hairstyle and clothing had remained mostly unchanged for over thousands of years. The hair was regarded as an integral part of the body - a gift from parents, and cutting it unnecessarily was seen as contrary to filial piety. The Qing government implemented the Tifayifu policy on Han Chinese people with increased pressure, leading to conflicts and massacres. It was not until early 20th century when the democratic revolutionaries repudiated the queue, calling it backward, and advocating short hairstyles for men.

==== Early resistance to Manchu impositions ====
During the final years of Ming, General Zheng Chenggong criticized the Qing hairstyle by referring to the shaven pate looking like a fly. Qing demanded Zheng Chenggong and his men to abide to the Tifayifu policy in exchange for recognizing Zheng Chenggong as a feudatory. However, Zheng Chenggong refused to surrender. The Qing also demanded that Zheng Jing and his men on Taiwan shave in order to receive recognition as a fiefdom. However, Zheng Jing's men and Ming prince Zhu Shugui fiercely objected to the shaving and adopting Manchu clothing, thus also refused to surrender.

==== Uprisings against Tifayifu ====
The Manchu rulers made the Tifayifu policy increasingly strict over the early years of the Qing dynasty, requiring all male citizens to not only wear a queue, but also to shave their forehead. This was encountered with greater opposition from the Han Chinese than the queue. From thence on, Han rebels including those involved in the Taiping Rebellion grew hair on the front of their heads as a symbol of their rebellion against the Qing even while retaining the queue. The Taiping rebels forced everybody in their territory to grow out their hair, which in turn was disliked by many people who had, by then, grown accustomed to shaving their foreheads. Both the Qing forces and the rebels killed people for having the 'wrong' hairstyle, as hairstyle was seen as an indicator of political affilitiation.

=== Qing's compromise ===
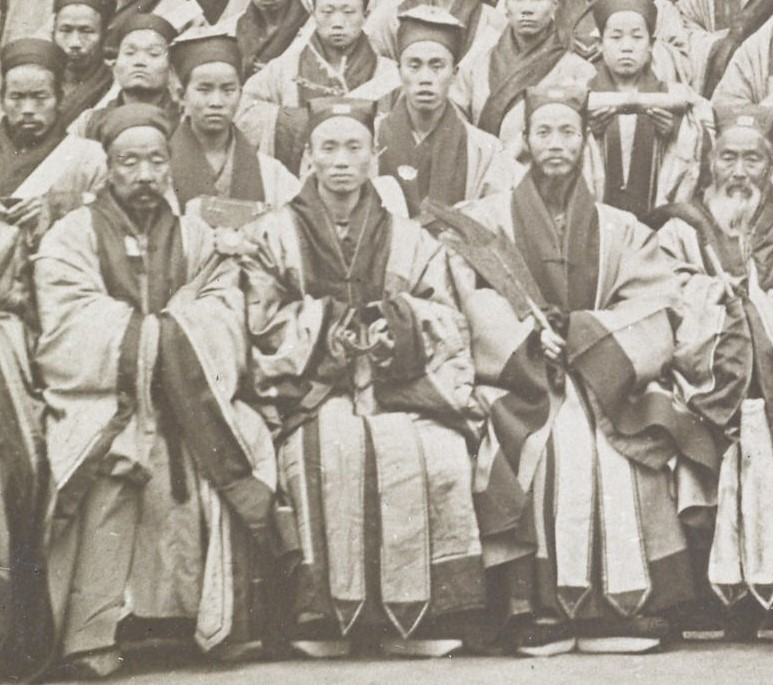
Taoist priests continue to wear traditional hanfu items. Photo taken from 1910 to 1911.

In an attempt to alleviate the public discontentment toward Tifayifu policy, the Qing government eventually decided to adopt a series of compromise policies. This series of compromise policies, referred as the shicong shibucong (Chinese: 十從十不從; lit. 'Ten rules that must be obeyed and ten that need not be obeyed'), were advocated by Jin Zhijun, a minister of the Ming dynasty who had surrendered to the Qing dynasty: the clothing of living men, government officials, Confucian scholars, and prostitutes had to follow the Manchu tradition; while women, children, deceased men, slaves, Taoist and Buddhist monks, theatrical actors were allowed to maintain Hanfu and maintain their customs.

Furthermore, with the consent of the Qing government, traditional Ming dynasty hanfu robes given by the Ming Emperors to the Chinese noble Dukes Yansheng descended from Confucius were preserved in the Confucius Mansion alongside robes from the Qing emperors. This compromise mirrored that of the Jurchens in the Jin dynasty and the Mongols in the Yuan dynasty who had continued to patronize and support the Confucian Duke Yansheng.

== Influence ==
Throughout the years, influence of the Hanfu Movement has reached the overseas Chinese diaspora and has led to the establishment of Hanfu Movement associations outside China, with the goal of promoting Chinese culture. While the cheongsam tend to be used as the representative of the national identity in the previous generation of the overseas diaspora, nowadays, the young people within the overseas Chinese diaspora are more incline in the use of hanfu. According to iiMedia, in 2019, the number of hanfu organizations outside of China was estimated to be around 2,000 whereas it was 1,300 in 2017; this marks an increase of 53.8%.

Overseas Hanfu Associations
Countries	Name of Hanfu Associations	Founded in
Argentina	Tiannan Hanjia Association (天南漢家)	
Australia	Sydney Hanfu Association (汉服在悉尼)	2011
Australia	Queensland Hanfu Association (昆士兰汉服社)	2016
Canada	Hanfu Movement of Eastern Canada (加東漢服運動)	2018
Canada	Association LingFeng Hanfu Montréal (蒙特利尔灵枫汉服社)	2008
Canada	The Hanfu Society of Art and Music/Toronto Hanfu Society (多倫多禮樂漢服)	
Europe	European Hanfu Association (歐洲漢服文化協會)	2008
Indonesia	Hanfu Movement Indonesia (印尼漢服運動)	
Malaysia	Hanfu Malaysia (馬來西亞漢服運動)	2007
Malaysia	Dong Hsuan Fang (东玄坊)	
New Zealand	Hanfu Association of NZ	
Singapore	Han Cultural Society	
United Kingdom	UK Han Culture Association	2007
United States	New York Han Corporation (Hanfu NYC) (紐約漢服社)	2014
United States	Fuyao Hanfu Association (扶摇汉服社)	
United States	Northern California Hanfu Association (北加州汉服社)	

== Controversy ==
=== Authenticity - Purists and reformists ===
Since the beginning of the Hanfu Movement, defining what would constitute as authentic hanfu has been a subject of debate and can even be a critical issue for hanfu event organizations, and diverse schools of thought have emerged. For example,

- The purists (the more conservative members of the group) believe in the replication of ancient garments as the only way to guarantee the authenticity of hanfu, and that a hanfu cannot be called hanfu without reference to artefacts.
- The reformists believe that the beauty and diversity of hanfu would be limited if it were restricted solely to the replication of archeological clothing artefacts. Consequently, they have embraced various modified styles of hanfu that differ from historical artefacts. They consider the garment authentic as long as it draws upon historical sources and adheres to the general principles of hanfu. In other words, they recognize both contemporary hanfu and ancient hanfu as legitimate forms of hanfu.
- Some argue that the Hanfu Movement is not intended to completely replicate ancient clothing, as it would be difficult to reproduce garments that are identical to historical artefacts and fully historically accurate. Instead, they believe that the modern hanfu should incorporate contemporary aesthetics, allowing for certain modifications, such as adjustments to the length of garments or sleeves, while still adhering to the general principles of Han Chinese clothing.

=== Cultural appropriation and hybridization ===
Some manufacturers have integrated the silhouettes of Hanfu with traditional patterns and design elements from China's ethnic minority groups, producing garments marketed as "Miao-style clothing", "Tibetan-style clothing", "Dai-style clothing", and other variants, but sell them under the false label of Hanfu. Because these hybrid garments could be produced more efficiently than regionally specific ethnic costumes, they were rapidly adopted by tourist-area photography studios. In some tourist destinations, they became the dominant form of ethnic-themed costume offered to visitors.

These developments have generated controversy among members of the hanfu community. Beyond the appropriation of motifs associated with ethnic minorities, commercial hanfu designers have also drawn on a range of non-Chinese cultural traditions. Online commentators have identified the incorporation of elements associated with Indian religions, Tibetan Buddhism, Shinto shrine maidens (miko), and Japanese family crests (kamon) into garments marketed as hanfu. Such designs typically retain hanfu-style garment construction while selectively adopting visual motifs, religious iconography, and aesthetic elements from other cultures. These practices have fueled ongoing debates over the extent to which hanfu can incorporate non-Han cultural elements while remaining a distinct cultural category, raising questions about historical authenticity, cultural ownership, and appropriation. Most supporters of the Hanfu movement refuse to recognize those clothing as Hanfu, and this is considered a sign of disrespect toward the Han ethnicity and other ethnic groups.

=== Quality of Hanfu on the market ===
Concerns have been expressed about the poor quality and inauthenticity of some hanfu currently available on the market. Controversies as such have damaged the reputation of hanfu and discouraged the production of authentic and original designs. Factors that inhibit the market for authentic, high-quality hanfu include a lack of consumer knowledge and the lower cost of inauthentic and poorly made spin-offs.

=== Criticism of the Movement ===
==== Domestic criticism of the movement and reservations within the movement ====
In 2007, skeptics feared that designating Hanfu as China's national costume could spark ethnic tensions, as China has 56 officially recognized ethnicities, each with distinctive traditional clothing. They decried the presence of "Han chauvinists in the movement. Enthusiasts, such as the Hanfu Society at Guangzhou University cautioned against politicizing the dress, fearing negative social repercussions. Hanfu advocates insist they never called for the abandonment of tradition by minorities, and that their fashion preferences are separate from their politics.

==== Criticism by Kevin Carrico - ultranationalism, fictional traditions, conspiracy theories ====
A vehement and protracted critique has been levied by Kevin Carrico, an Western scholar of contemporary Chinese society at Macquarie University in Australia. Carrico has criticized hanfu as an "invented style of dress" that transitioned from a fictional tradition to a reality on Chinese streets. He argues there is no historical basis for specific apparel under the name "hanfu" and that the movement is inherently racial, built on the narrative that Qing dynasty's Manchu rulers aimed to destroy Han people and Chinese civilization, transforming it into barbarism. Kevin Carrico argues that real historical atrocities, like the Yangzhou massacre and the queue decree, are mixed with the imaginary erasure of Han clothing in the Hanfu Movement, leading to the movement being driven by conspiracy theories suggesting a secret Manchu plot controlling key institutions in China since the post-1978 reform era.

=== Defense of the movement ===
==== Proportional representation and fairness for the Han in modern China ====
In 2001, netizens opposed Chinese politicians wearing tangzhuang at the APEC summit, considering it inappropriate and non-representative due to its Manchu origin when over 90% of China's citizens are ethnic Han. They associate the dress with the Qing dynasty, whom they hold responsible for the suppression of Han culture, and for failure to deal with Western predation during the Century of Humiliation. Proponents cite the persistence of traditional clothing among Chinese minorities and the use of kimono in Japan, hanbok in Korea, and the sari in India as inspiration for the Hanfu Movement, and reason that the Han should have their own ethnic dress celebrated as well.

==== Fun and recreation, moderate nationalism not ultranationalism ====
Ying Dai of Cardiff University notes that the modern Chinese public views Hanfu as a symbol of traditional aesthetics, heritage and culture, saying that the movement exhibits a moderate and positive vision of Chinese nationalism. Colin Mackerras, while noting the pride of Chinese people in Chinese culture, views the movement as more likely driven by recreational needs such as fun and relaxation, rather than animated by Han revanchism. James Leibold of La Trobe University notes that Hanfu pioneers believe the issue of Han clothing is tied to racial identity and political power in China but highlights the movement's diversity, with individuals finding various meanings and enjoyment in Hanfu. Eric Fish, a freelance writer who lived in China from 2007 to 2014 as a teacher, student, and journalist, believes that the Hanfu Movement does have "patriotic undertones" but "most Hanfu enthusiasts are in it for the fashion and community more than a racial or xenophobic motivation" and that contrary to popular belief, China's "young people overall are progressively getting less nationalistic".

==== Critical appraisal of Kevin Carrico's arguments ====
Critics expressed concerns about his portrayal of Chinese studies, contemporary anthropology, and Chinese nationalism, suggesting his work might inaccurately simplify or misrepresent these areas Reviewers criticized the book for dismissing ethnography, misunderstanding or omitting the narratives of his Chinese informants, offering revisionist stories about China's past and the Maoist era, and leaving issues such as other ideological drivers of the Hanfu Movement and the views of non-Han participants unaddressed One reviewer expresses that people in China are proud of China and Chinese culture; however, the donning of traditional Chinese clothing is more likely for fun or relaxation than as being part of a sinister plot evolving around Han nationalist revival.

== See also ==
- Hanfu
- Chinese clothing
- History of China
- Chinese Culture
- Guzhuang – Fantasy-based Chinese costumes inspired by ancient Chinese clothing
- Han nationalism and Han chauvinism
