= Affirmative action in China =

Affirmative action of ethnic minorities in China
- Chinese: 优惠政策
- Traditional Chinese: 優惠政策
- Literal meaning: Preferential policy
Transcriptions
Standard Mandarin
- Hanyu Pinyin: Yōuhuì zhèngcè

In the People's Republic of China, the government had instated affirmative action policies for ethnic minorities called preferential policy (simplified Chinese: 优惠政策; traditional Chinese: 優惠政策; pinyin: Yōuhuì zhèngcè) or bonus point for minority ethnic groups (simplified Chinese: 少数民族加分; traditional Chinese: 少數民族加分; pinyin: Shǎoshù mínzú jiāfēn in College Entrance Examination) when it began in 1949 and still had impact until today. The policies give preferential treatment to ethnic minorities in China. For example, minority ethnic groups in China were not subjected to its well-publicized (former) one-child policy. Three principles are the basis for the policy: equality for national minorities, territorial autonomy, and equality for all languages and cultures.

== Affirmative action policies ==
No taxes in minority regions are required to be sent to the central government; all of it can be spent locally. Minorities receive proportional representation in local government. Higher-level jurisdictions ask lower-level minority areas to put forth "extensive efforts to support the country's construction by providing more natural resources" and in exchange gives them infrastructural subsidies such as personnel training, budgetary subventions, and disproportionate public works investments. The Chinese government encourages business to hire minorities and offers no-interest loans to businesses operated by minorities. Prominent government posts may be filled with "model" citizens who are also minorities.

Minority students applying to universities receive bonus points on the National Higher Education Entrance Examination (gaokao). In 2009 authorities in Chongqing uncovered 31 high school students pretending to be members of a minority group in order to gain test points, and in 2011 Inner Mongolia authorities uncovered about 800 students pretending to be members of a minority group. There is a system of universities exclusively for minority students. The government established bilingual programs to help minorities learn Mandarin Chinese. Scholars are creating alphabets for minority languages that had not been previously written as a way of preserving those languages.

The Chinese government officially allowed minority parents to have more than one child per family instead of the one demanded for Han people as part of the (former) one-child policy. Rena Singer of Knight-Ridder Newspapers wrote that "In practice, many minority families simply have as many children as they want."

Singer wrote that the policies are meant to encourage assimilation instead of empowering minority blocs and "The idea is to give the minorities just enough power, education or economic success to keep them quiet." An article by Nicholas Kristof in The New York Times describes that the affirmative action policy is quite effective. A Western diplomat in Beijing remarked that real effort was put in by the government to bring minorities into high-profile positions, which "has its own value because then they begin to serve as role models [for other minorities to follow]."

== Historical precedents ==
Fuk'anggan, a Manchu military leader, recommended for an increase in the quota for Hui people in the civil and military suishi examinations during a 1785 memorial from the governor of Gansu and Shaanxi provinces. Li Zonghan (C: 李宗瀚, P: Lǐ Zōnghàn, W: Li Tsung-han), the Hunan provincial education commissioner, requested a quota for Miao people candidates for provincial examinations during an 1807 memorial. This is so the Han Chinese people, who had better preparation to take the examinations, would not crowd out Miao. Li Zonghan argued that local officials would need to have suspicion of Han pretending to be Miao in order to fit the quota criteria. Taiwanese Plains Aborigines also had a quota under the Qing.

== Influence on Chinese society ==
The affirmative action of the Chinese government has been called into question of late, especially from the ethnic group of Han Chinese. Unfair policies on Chinese college entrance exams, as well as human rights considered to be favoring the minorities, have both been believed to be causing reverse discrimination on the mainland. The Chinese government has been scaling back on affirmative action since 2019.

Han chauvinism has been becoming more popular in mainland China since the 2000s, the cause of which has been attributed to the discontent toward Chinese affirmative action.

== See also ==
- Korenizatsiya
- Liangshaoyikuan
- List of endangered languages in China

== Notes ==
- Elman, Benjamin A. A Cultural History of Civil Examinations in Late Imperial China. University of California Press, 2000. ISBN 052092147X, 9780520921474.
- Sautman, Barry. "Affirmative Action, Ethnic Minorities and China's Universities." (Archive) Pacific Rim Law & Policy Journal. Pacific Rim Law & Policy Association, January 1998. Volume 7, No. 1. p. 77-116. - Info page.
