= Immigrant communities in Northern Ireland =

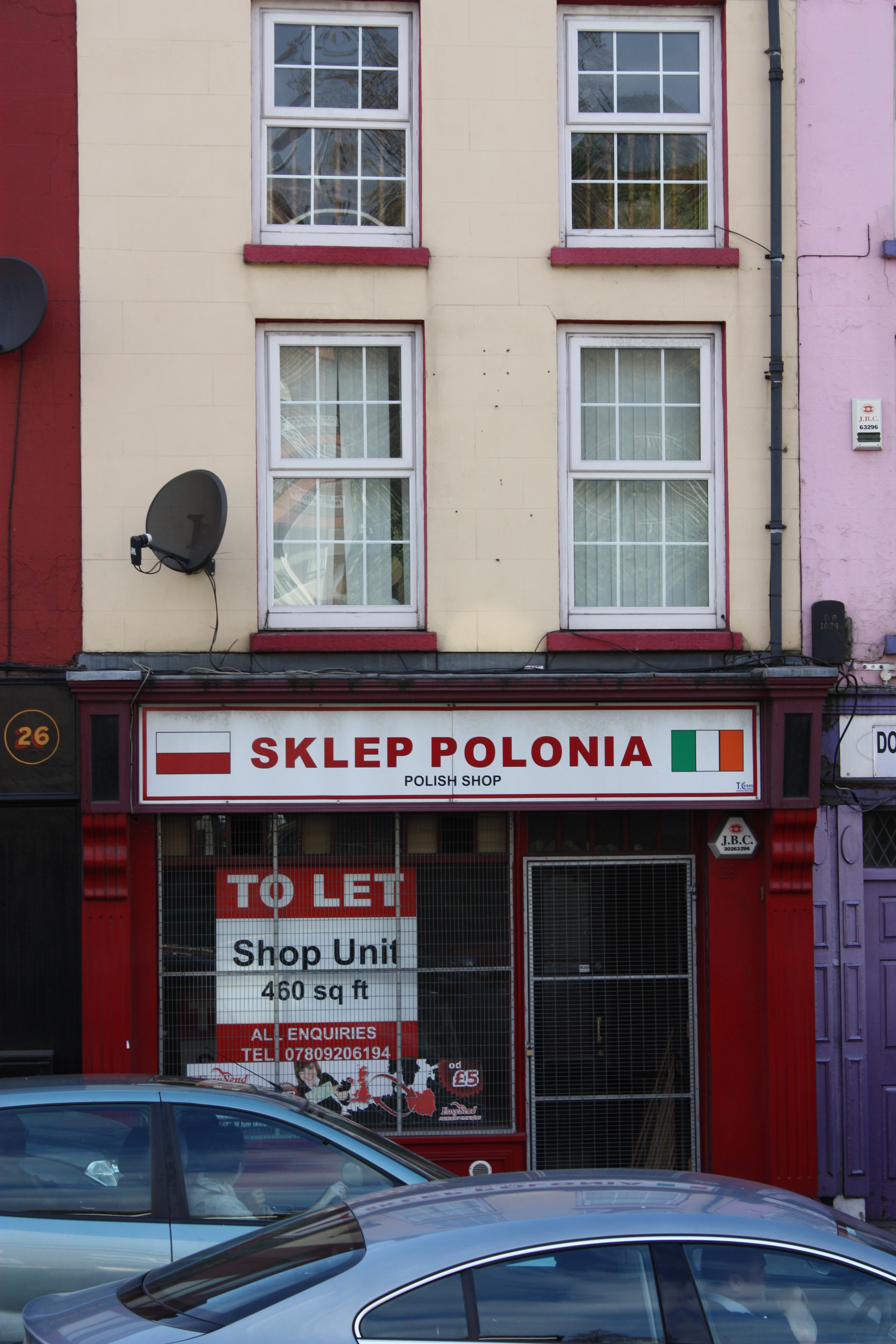
The premises of a Polish shop in Newry displaying a Polish flag alongside the tricolour

Even before Northern Ireland was established, there were a small number of ethnic minorities living in the area. During the Troubles (1970s, 1980s and 1990s), levels of immigration to Northern Ireland were normally low, nevertheless that does not mean they were insignificant, having contributed to Northern Ireland in economy, business and professional skills. However, there has been an increase since the Good Friday Agreement brought an end to most of the violence.

The majority of ethnic minority people live in the Greater Belfast area, although they live across Northern Ireland, groups are concentrated in other parts of the province.

== Black African and Afro-Caribbean ==
Many people of African descent live in Northern Ireland. This includes those from the Afro-Caribbean community as well as those from African countries. Many are professionals.

George Henry Thompson, who was either an African-American or from Jamaica, lived and worked in Belfast in the early 1870s. There is no record of where he lived in the town but it may have been in Millfield. He was a performer with a travelling theatre called McCormack's Show which set up a semi-permanent 'Penny Theatre' in Townsend Street in early 1872. Thompson performed in their plays such as 'Dick Turpin's Ride to York' and led Plantation Breakdown dances which mimicked those in minstrel shows which were popular in Ireland at the time. In February 1872 he appeared in Court charged with fighting in Townsend Street. It was found that the other person charged started the fight and Thompson was discharged. Later in the same year he is recorded as working for a Mr Martin in Ligoniel. In the serious sectarian rioting of August 1872 he found himself willingly or unwillingly leading a mob of Shankill Road Protestants who were attacking Catholics and advising Catholic residents to leave that area. At the County Antrim Assizes held in early 1873 he was sentenced to 2 years in prison with hard labour for heading a riotous mob. His involvement in the riots led to Nationalist newspapers publishing racist songs and poems about him and mocking the Protestants for having a black person apparently lead them in the disturbances. What became of him afterwards is not clear but it is possible he moved to England and changed his name.

Louis Scott has been mentioned as 'one of a few black members of the Ulster Defence Association' in Henry McDonald and Jim Cusack's UDA: inside the heart of loyalist terror.

In January 1980, Max Olorunda, an accountant born in Nigeria, was killed by an incendiary bomb planted by the IRA aboard a train travelling from Ballymena to Belfast when it detonated prematurely in Dunmurry. His daughter Jayne published a book 'Legacy' in 2013 detailing the impact this had on her and her family.

Lillian Seenoi-Barr was the first Black councillor and the first Black politician in Northern Ireland when she was selected for an SDLP seat for Foyleside, Derry City Council in 2021. She has Kenyan heritage and lived in Northern Ireland for over a decade before her election.

== Asian ==
=== Chinese ===
The first ethnic minority to arrive in significant numbers was the people of Chinese origin. There were 3,329 people speaking Chinese as their main language in 2021.

A period of time in the 1960s occurred when the first Chinese immigrants to Northern Ireland were able to settle in the country. Chinese restaurants are without a doubt the most prevalent non-native restaurant genre in Northern Ireland, as many of the original immigrants set up a food outlet in order to support their families in the region.

According to the Chinese embassy there are nearly 10,000 overseas Chinese residents in Northern Ireland, as of 2007. This figure may or may not include people of Chinese origin from elsewhere than China.

=== South Asian ===
Apart from the minority groups from Asia, most came from Commonwealth countries such as India and Pakistan. This immigration has led to the building of Belfast Islamic Centre and also a Hindu Temple to cater for spiritual needs of Hindu people. There is also an Asian supermarket on the Ormeau Road in Belfast. Most South Asians live in Central and Southern Belfast, in areas such as Ballynafeigh and Shaftesbury.

== European ==
=== Portuguese ===
As of 2022, there are over 5,000 Portuguese speakers in Northern Ireland. This wave has been more recent, having started in the 1990s. Northern Ireland's lusophone population is located primarily in Dungannon, County Tyrone (where many work in the Moy Park factory) and Portadown, County Armagh.

=== Polish ===
As of 2021, there are more than 22,300 Polish people living in Northern Ireland. A report showed that in a 2007 Police Service of Northern Ireland's recruitment drive, nearly 1,000 Polish people applied to become officers.

== Notable people ==
There are a number of well known people from Northern Ireland who are from an ethnic minority background. Chaim Herzog, President of Israel from 1983 to 1993, was born in Belfast. Others include Andre Shoukri, a convicted UDA terrorist whose father is from Egypt, the Liberal Democrat politician Lembit Opik, who is of Estonian parentage, and Alliance Party politician Anna Lo was born in North Point, British Hong Kong to Cantonese Chinese parents, and moved to Northern Ireland in 1974. Freddie Scappaticci and Angelo Fusco were two IRA members of Italian ancestry.

== See also ==
- Religion in Northern Ireland
