= Cultural backwardness =

Soviet political term

Cultural backwardness (Russian: культурная отсталость, romanized: kul'turnaya otstalost') was a term used by Soviet politicians and ethnographers. There were at one point officially 97 "culturally backward" nationalities in the Soviet Union. Members of a "culturally backward" nationality were eligible for preferential treatment in university admissions. In 1934 the Central Executive Committee declared that the term should no longer be used; however, preferential treatment for certain minorities and the promotion of local nationals in the party structure through korenizatsiya continued for several more years.

== Characteristics ==
The People's Commissariat for Education listed five official characteristics of culturally backward nationalities:

- An extremely low level of literacy
- An extremely low percentage of children in school
- Absence of a written script connected to a literary language
- Existence of "social vestiges" (oppression of women, racial hostility, nomadism, religious fanaticism)
- An extremely low level of national cadres

== List of nationalities identified as culturally backward ==
In 1932 the People's Commissariat for Education published an official list of "culturally backward" nationalities:

- Abkhaz
- Adjarians
- Aleut
- Assyrian
- Azerbaijanis
- Avars
- Baksan (a tribe of Balkars)
- Balkars
- Bashkirs
- Besermyan
- Bulgarians
- Buryats
- Chechen
- Cherkes (Adyghe)
- Chinese
- Chud (Baltic Finnic peoples)
- Chukchi
- Chuvans
- Chuvash
- Dargins
- Dolgans
- Dungans
- Eskimo
- Giliaks (Nivkhs)
- Golds (Nanai)
- Greeks
- Ingush
- Izhorians
- Kabardin
- Kaitaks (now classified as Dargins)
- Kalmyks
- Kamchadals
- Karachays
- Karagasy (Tofalars)
- Kara-nogais
- Karakalpaks
- Karelians
- Kazakhs
- Kets
- Khakas
- Komi-Permyaks
- Komi-Zyrians
- Koryaks
- Koreans
- Krymchaks
- Kumandins
- Kumyks
- Kurds
- Kurd-ezid (Yazidis)
- Kyrgyz
- Laks
- Lamuts (Evens)
- Lezgins
- Lopars (Sami)
- Manegry (Evenks)
- Mari
- Moldovans
- Mongols
- Mordvins
- Nagaybak
- Negidals
- Nenets
- Nogais
- Oirats
- Oroch
- Orochen (Orochon, a tribal division of Evenks)
- Ossetians
- Ostyak (Khanty)
- Persians
- Roma (Gypsies)
- Rutuls
- Samagir (Nanai)
- Shapsugs
- Shors
- Soyot
- Tabasarans
- Tajiks
- Taranchis
- Tats
- Tatars (outside of the Tatar ASSR)
- Tavgi (Nganasans)
- Teptyars (also classified as Bashkirs)
- Teleuts
- Tungus (Evenks)
- Turkmen
- Tuvans
- Udege
- Udmurts
- Ulch
- Uyghurs
- Uzbeks
- Vepsians
- Voguls (Mansi)
- Votes
- Yakuts
- Yukaghir

== See also ==
- Eurocentrism – Worldview centred on or biased towards Western civilization
- Korenizatsiia – 1920s Soviet policy of promoting its indigenous ethnic groups
- Russification – Measures to increase the influence of Russian culture and language
- Sovietization – Adoption of Soviet political system and mentality
