= Korenizatsiia =

1920s policy of promoting indigenous ethnic groups within the Soviet Union

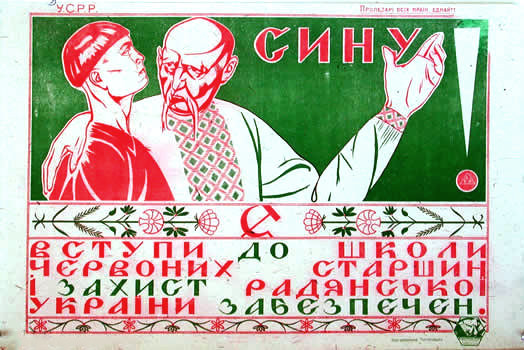
The 1921 Soviet recruitment to the Military Education poster with the Ukrainization theme. The text reads: "Son! Enroll in the School of Red Commanders, and the defence of Soviet Ukraine will be ensured." The poster uses traditional Ukrainian imagery with Ukrainian-language text to reach a wider appeal. The School of Red Commanders in Kharkiv had the task of promoting the careers of the Ukrainian national cadre in the army.

Korenizatsiia (Russian: коренизация, romanized: korenizatsiya, pronounced [kərʲɪnʲɪˈzatsɨjə]; transl. "indigenization" or "nativization") was an early policy of the Soviet Union for the integration of non-Russian nationalities into the governments of their specific Soviet republics. This term comes from the word korennoi in the phrase korennoi narod, which means "native people" or "indigenous population". In the 1920s, the policy promoted representatives of the titular nation, and their national minorities, into the lower administrative levels of the local government, bureaucracy, and nomenklatura of their own Soviet republics. The main idea of the korenizatsiia was to grow communist cadres for every nationality. In Russian, the term korenizatsiya (коренизация) derives from korennoye naseleniye (коренное население, "native population"). The policy practically ended in the mid-1930s with the deportations of various nationalities. The goal of korenizatsiia was to engage non-Russian populations through the cultivation of national identities, which Soviet leaders believed would enable their transition toward "universal culture, the revolution, and communism".

Politically and culturally, the nativization policy aimed to eliminate Russian domination and culture in Soviet republics where ethnic Russians did not constitute a majority. This policy was implemented even in areas with large Russian-speaking populations; for instance, all children in Ukraine were taught in the Ukrainian language in school. The policies of korenizatsiia facilitated the Communist Party's establishment of the local languages in government and education, in publishing, in culture, and in public life. In that manner, the cadre of the local Communist Party were promoted to every level of government, and ethnic Russians working in said governments were required to learn the local language and culture of the given Soviet republic.

Lenin (1870-1924) believed that nationalism had the potential to attract class allies for the Bolsheviks and that the historical distrust of non-Russian peoples toward Great Russians could be overcome in this way. Korenizatsiia was a preventive policy designed to stop the rise of nationalism among the non-Russian peoples who had been oppressed in the past. The Bolsheviks believed that Great Russian chauvinism was a bigger danger than local national movements. Because of this, korenizatsiia also included criticism of Russian culture and of the use of the Russian alphabet, which were linked to the colonial and Russification policies of the former Tsarist regime. Korenizatsiia was also designed to support the decolonization process, which the Bolsheviks saw as unavoidable, while at the same time helping to maintain the territorial unity of the former Russian Empire.

== Beginnings ==
The nationalities policy was formulated by the Bolshevik party in 1913, four years before they came to power in Russia. Vladimir Lenin sent a young Joseph Stalin (himself a Georgian and therefore an ethnic minority member) to Vienna, which was a very ethnically diverse city due to its status as capital of the Austro-Hungarian empire. Stalin reported back to Moscow with his ideas for the policy. It was summarized in Stalin's pamphlet (his first scholarly publication), Marxism and the National Question (1913).

The first clear and comprehensive expression of the policy was published by Joseph Stalin in an article in Pravda on 10 October 1920. In this article, Stalin stated that all Soviet institutions operating in the border regions—including courts, administration, economic bodies, local governments, and Party organizations—should be composed of individuals who understood the customs, way of life, and languages of the local populations. This statement marked a turning point in Soviet nationalities policy.

Korenizatsiia was later systematically defined, especially during the Party Congresses of March 1921 and April 1923, and was shaped around two main objectives:

1. Training of national cadres (elites): The goal was to create a class of administrators and specialists from among the local populations. In this way, greater representation of local people in the lower levels of the Soviet bureaucracy was encouraged.
2. Linguistic localization (linguistic korenizatsiia): It aimed to promote the use of local national languages in public administration, education, and the press. These languages were intended to replace Russian and become dominant within their respective regions.

As adopted in 1923 korenizatsiia involved teaching and administration in the language of the republic; and promoting non-Russians to positions of power in Republic administrations and the party, including for a time the creation of a special administrative units called natssovety (нацсоветы, national selsoviets) and natsrayony (нацрайоны, national districts) based on concentrations of minorities within what were minority republics. For example, in Ukraine in the late 1920s there were even natssovety for Russians and Estonians.

In 1920s, there still was animosity towards the Russians and towards other nationalities on the part of the Russians, but there were also conflicts and rivalries among other nationalities.

== Against Great-Russian chauvinism ==
In 1923, at the 12th Party Congress, Stalin identified two threats to the success of the party's "nationalities policy": Great Power Chauvinism (Russian: великодержавный шовинизм, romanized: velikoderzhavnyy shovinizm, chauvinism of the great power) and local nationalism. However, he described the former as the greater danger:

[The] Great-Russian chauvinist spirit, which is becoming stronger and stronger owing to the N.E.P., . . . [finds] expression in an arrogantly disdainful and heartlessly bureaucratic attitude on the part of Russian Soviet officials towards the needs and requirements of the national republics. The multi-national Soviet state can become really durable, and the co-operation of the peoples within it really fraternal, only if these survivals are vigorously and irrevocably eradicated from the practice of our state institutions. Hence, the first immediate task of our Party is vigorously to combat the survivals of Great-Russian chauvinism.

The main danger, Great-Russian chauvinism, should be kept in check by the Russians themselves, for the sake of the larger goal of building socialism. Within the (minority) nationality areas new institutions should be organized giving the state a national (minority) character everywhere, built on the use of the nationality languages in government and education, and on the recruitment and promotion of leaders from the ranks of minority groups. On the central level the nationalities should be represented in the Soviet of Nationalities.

== Creation of socialist nations ==
The main idea of the korenizatsiia was to grow communist cadres for every nationality. By the mid-1930s the percentage of locals in both the party and state service grew considerably.

The initial period of korenizatsiia went together with the development of national-territorial administrative units and national cultures. The latter was reflected above all in the areas of language construction and education. For several of the small nationalities in Russia that had no literary language, a "Committee of the North" helped to create alphabets so that the national languages could be taught in schools and literacy could be brought to the people in their native languages—and the minorities would thereby be brought from backwardness to the modern world. And in the very large Ukrainian Republic, the program of Ukrainianization led to a profound shift of the language of instruction in schools to Ukrainian.

In 1930, Stalin proclaimed at the 16th Party Congress that building socialism was a period of blossoming of national cultures. The final goal would be to merge into one international culture with a common language. Russian cultural heritage was under attack, churches were closed and demolished, old specialists were dismissed, and science and art were proletarianized.

The Bolsheviks' tactics in their struggle to neutralise nationalist aspirations led to political results by the beginning of the 1930s. The old structure of the Russian Empire had been destroyed and a hierarchical federal state structure, based on the national principle, was created. The structure was nationality-based states in which nationality cultures were blossoming, and nationality languages were spoken and used at schools and in local administration. The transition was real, not merely a centralized Russian empire camouflaged.

The 17th Party congress in 1934 proclaimed that the building of the material basis for a socialist society had succeeded. The Soviet Union first became an officially socialist society in 1936 when the new constitution was adopted. The new constitution stated that the many socialist nations had transformed on a voluntary basis into a harmonious union. According to the new constitution there were 11 socialist republics, 22 autonomous republics, nine autonomous regions and nine national territories. At the same time, administration was now greatly centralised. All the Republics were now harnessed to serve one common socialist state.

== End of korenizatsiia ==
=== Purges of national cadre ===
Between 1933 and 1938 korenizatsiia was not actually repealed. Its provisions merely stopped being enforced. There also began purges of the leaderships of the national republics and territories. The charge against non-Russians was that they had instigated national strife and oppressed the Russians or other minorities in the republics. In 1937, the Soviet government proclaimed that local elites had become hired foreign agents and their goal had become dismemberment of the Soviet Union and the restoration of capitalism. National leaderships of the republics and autonomies were liquidated en masse.

=== Reversal to Russification ===
By the mid-1930s, with purges in some of the national areas, the policy of korenizatsiia took a new turn, and by the end of the 1930s the policy of promoting local languages began to be balanced by greater Russianization, though perhaps not overt Russification or attempts to assimilate the minorities. By this time, non-Russians found their appetite whetted rather than satiated by korenizatsiia and there was indication it was encouraging inter-ethnic violence to the extent that the territorial integrity of the USSR would be in danger. In addition, ethnic Russians resented the institutionalized and artificial "reverse discrimination" that benefited non-Russians and regarded them as ungrateful and manipulative as a result. Another concern was that the Soviet Union's westernmost minorities – Belarusians, Ukrainians, Poles, Finns etc. – who had been previously treated with conscious benevolence in order to provide propaganda value to members of their ethnic groups in nations bordering the USSR (and thus facilitating future national unification, which would then bring about territorial expansion of the USSR) were now instead increasingly seen as vulnerable to influence from across the border, "fifth columns" for expansionist states seeking to acquire Soviet territory inhabited by their own ethnic group. The adherence of the masses to national rather than class identity was as strong in Russia as in other republics and regions. Between 1937 and 1953, racial policies began to creep into nationality policies, with certain nationalities seen as having immutable traits, particularly nationalities in the unstable borderlands.

Moreover, Stalin seemed set on greatly reducing the number of officially recognized nationalities by contracting the official list of nationalities in the 1939 census, compared with the 1926 census.

From 1937, the central press started to praise Russian language and Russian culture. Mass campaigns were organized to denounce the "enemies of the people". "Bourgeois nationalists" were new enemies of the Russian people which had suppressed the Russian language. The policy of indigenization was abandoned. In the following years, the Russian language became a compulsory subject in all Soviet schools.

Pre-revolution Russian nationalism was also rehabilitated. Many of the heroes of Russian history were re-appropriated for glorification. The Russian people became the "elder brother" of the "socialist family of nations". A new kind of patriotism, Soviet patriotism, emerged, with national survival taking priority over ideological conflicts between communists and fascists.

On 24 January 1938, the Central Committee of the VKP(b) adopted the resolution "On the Reorganization of National Schools," which ordered that "special national schools" be reorganized into "ordinary schools of the conventional type," abolished special national branches within these schools, and required instruction to be conducted either in the language of the relevant republic or in Russian. Schools that taught in "small" languages were denounced as "hotbeds of bourgeois nationalist and anti-Soviet influence on children" and were almost entirely eliminated, being converted to Russian or the titular republican languages of instruction. National village councils and national districts were abolished. On 13 March 1938 the Central Committee of the VKP(b) and the Council of People's Commissars of the USSR passed the resolution on "On the Compulsory Study of the Russian Language in the Schools of the National Republics and Regions". The teaching of Russian became compulsory in all non-Russian schools, making Russian a mandatory subject and establishing it as the lingua franca of the Soviet Union. During the late 1930s, most non-Russian languages that used the Latin alphabet were converted to Cyrillic, with the exception of well-established literary languages that had long used their own non-Cyrillic scripts, such as Armenian, Finnish, Georgian, Yiddish, and the Baltic languages.

According to Yuri Slezkine, ethnic groups with their own republics and well-developed bureaucracies retained their distinct national cultures, while Soviet nationality policy "abandoned the pursuit of countless rootless nationalities in order to concentrate on a few full-fledged, fully equipped 'nations.'"

Moldova became part of the USSR as a consequence of the Molotov–Ribbentrop Pact. Soon after, the language of the country was renamed to "Moldavian" and it ceased being written in the Latin alphabet, changing to Cyrillic. This policy would only be reversed in 1989, after large demonstrations imbued with patriotic feeling. Romanian is an official language in the Moldovan constitution since its independence, and it is Moldova's sole official language today. Russian is still in use but not as important as it was in the Soviet era, since it has no special status in the country and its usage as mother tongue has been declining for some time.

During the Soviet era, a significant number of ethnic Russians and Ukrainians migrated to other Soviet republics, and many of them settled there. According to the last census in 1989, the Russian 'diaspora' in the Soviet republics had reached 25 million.

Some historians evaluating the Soviet Union as a colonial empire ("Soviet Empire"), applied the "prison of nations" idea to the USSR. Thomas Winderl wrote "The USSR became in a certain sense more a prison-house of nations than the old Empire had ever been."

== See also ==
- National delimitation in the Soviet Union – Process of creating national territorial units from the ethnic diversity of USSR
- Ukrainization – Efforts to promote the Ukrainian language and culture in Ukraine
  - Ukrainization in the 1920s and 1930s
- Russification – Measures to increase the influence of Russian culture and language
- Cultural backwardness – Soviet political term
- Latinisation in the Soviet Union – 1920s–1930s script reform campaign
- Cyrillisation in the Soviet Union – Move from Latin scripts to Cyrillic
- Bilingual education – Education conducted in two languages
- Declaration of Rights of Peoples of Russia – 1917 Soviet document by Lenin and Stalin
- Ethnopluralism – Political model attempting to preserve separate and bordered ethno-cultural regions
- Affirmative action in China
- Liangshaoyikuan – Chinese government policy
- Sovietization – Adoption of Soviet political system and mentality
  - ... of: the Baltic states, the Caucasus, Georgia, Armenia
