= Ethnic penalty =

Economic and non-economic disadvantage

In sociology, the term ethnic penalty is used in reference to the economic and non-economic disadvantages that particular ethnicities experience in the labour market compared to other ethnic groups. As an area of study among behavioral economists, psychologists, and sociologists, it ranges beyond discrimination so non-cognitive factors can also be taken into consideration in order to explain why unwarranted differences exist between individuals with similar abilities because they are members of different ethnicities.

== Overview ==
The concept of the ethnic penalty was first discussed by Oxford sociologist Anthony Heath. Heath originally looked at the ethnic penalty by making comparisons between two groups in Britain, whites and blacks, noting that unemployment of black African men was twice as high as unemployment of white men. Using 2001 UK census data, Johnston et al. suggest that all ethno-religious groups in the UK experienced ethnic penalties in the labour market, with the exception of White British ethno-religious groups. Carmichael and Woods additionally show that "the penalties paid vary considerably between the minority groups" studied, in the case of black, Indian, Pakistani, and Bangladeshi workers in the United Kingdom. Simpson, Purdam, Tajar, et al. also found that this differs between UK-born members of an ethnic minority and those of the same ethnicity born abroad – UK-born males are more likely to be unemployed than males from overseas, while UK-born women "tend to do better in the labour market than their overseas-born counterparts". Beyond this, Simpson et al. confirmed that this disadvantage is not tied to "concentration of ethnic minorities in deprived areas"; those of an "ethnic minority were still twice as likely to be unemployed than their White counterparts... even in areas that are predominantly White".

Ethnic penalties are usually measured as differences in labour market outcomes between minorities and the majority that remain after controlling for human capital and social background characteristics in a statistical model. The ethnic penalty can be related to unemployment, occupational status or over-qualification. Ethnic penalties in the labour market are explained by a diversity of factors, such as individual characteristics, country characteristics, the social environment in the host country, and the policy environment in the host country and tested them separately. However, ethnic penalties are usually attributed to employers' discriminatory behaviour against minorities.

== See also ==
- Discrimination based on nationality
- Gender pay gap
