= Liangshaoyikuan =

Chinese government policy

Liangshaoyikuan (Chinese: 兩少一寬; lit. 'two fewers [in arrests and executions] and one leniency [in sentencing]'), was a policy of the government of the People's Republic of China of giving leniency in charges and sentences with regard to minorities as compared to Han for the same criminal offenses. The policy was enacted in 1984 by Peng Zhen and Hu Yaobang. On July 9, 2010, a statement jointly published by the Publicity Department of the Chinese Communist Party, State Ethnic Affairs Commission, and United Front Work Department suggested that "everyone should be equal before the law, and criminals should be punished regardless of their ethnicity". However, they do not have the legal authority to challenge a policy implemented by the Central Committee of the Chinese Communist Party, a higher authority; the policy has thus never been officially repealed.

== Background ==
In November 1931, the policy of the treatment toward ethnic minorities by the Chinese Communist Party was formulated in Ruijin, Jiangxi Province, then capital of the Chinese Soviet Republic. On September 29, 1949, with communist control over most of China, the formal policy toward ethnic minorities for the future People's Republic of China was formulated. Over time, the policy was believed to be the source of tensions between the Han majority and ethnic minorities, as well as cover for ethnic minority separatists. At the time of its abolition, the policy was heavily opposed by prominent members of the ethnic minorities, who believed it encouraged criminal activity among young members of ethnic minority groups.

== Impact ==
The policy is controversial in the sense of promoting social inequality.

== See also ==
- Hu Yaobang
- Korenizatsiya
- Zhonghua minzu
- Ethnic minorities in China
- Social equality
- Reverse discrimination
