= Lutheran Church–Missouri Synod v. FCC =

1998 court case

- Court: United States Court of Appeals for the District of Columbia Circuit
- Full case name: Lutheran Church–Missouri Synod v. Federal Communications Commission and United States of America
- Decided: April 14, 1998
- Citation: 141 F.3d 344, 354, 356

Court membership
- Judges sitting: Stephen F. Williams, Laurence H. Silberman, David B. Sentelle

Keywords
- LCMS FCC EEO Act 5th Amendment

Lutheran Church–Missouri Synod v. FCC was a 1998 D.C. Circuit Court of Appeals case involving the Federal Communications Commission's (FCC) enforcement of the Equal Employment Opportunity Act and the Fifth Amendment. The FCC claimed that the Lutheran Church–Missouri Synod (LCMS) had violated the FCC's Equal Employment Opportunity requirements by not hiring enough minorities/women and by requiring a knowledge of Lutheran doctrine in order to be hired to work at its two FM and AM radio stations located in Clayton, Missouri.

== History ==
The Lutheran Church–Missouri Synod first began broadcasting religious content on the radio in 1924 on KFUO, which is a daytime non-profit AM station located on the Concordia Seminary campus grounds in Clayton, Missouri. KFUO was founded by Richard Kretzschmar, John Fritz, and Dr. Walter A. Maier. It is the nation's longest running religious radio station. They later added a full-time commercial broadcast station in 1948, still with a religious focus, KFUO-FM. According to the Lutheran Church–Missouri Synod, the stations "have been dedicated to the task of carrying out in their way the Great Commission which Christ gave to His Church, to preach the Gospel to every creature and to nurture and serve the people in a variety of ways."

== Background ==
In May 1978, the FCC adopted its Statement of Policy on Minority Ownership of Broadcasting Facilities, 68 FCC 2d 979. This policy outlined two elements of a minority ownership policy:

- 1) The Commission pledged to consider minority ownership as one factor in comparative proceedings for new licenses. In comparing mutually exclusive applications for new radio or television broadcast stations, it looked first at six factors, but under the new policy, it must consider minority ownership and participation in management as a "plus" to be weighed together with the other six factors.
- 2) The FCC outlined a plan to increase minority opportunities to receive reassigned and transferred licenses through the "distress sale" policy. This policy would allow a broadcaster whose license had been designated for a revocation hearing, or whose renewal application had been designated for hearing, to assign the license to an FCC-approved minority enterprise.

Congress and the FCC selected these minority ownership policies to promote program diversity, which they saw as an important governmental objective. In addition, they would serve as a constitutional basis for the preference policies.

The FCC adopted these policies in an attempt to satisfy its obligation under the Communications Act of 1934 to promote diversification of programming. It argued that its past efforts to promote diversification in the broadcast industry had been insufficient, and detrimental to not only the minority audience, but also the listening and viewing public as a whole.

=== Metro Broadcasting, Inc. v. FCC ===
In the case of Metro Broadcasting, Inc. v. FCC (1990), the constitutionality of the two elements of the FCC's Policy on Minority Ownership of Broadcasting Facilities from 1978 came under scrutiny.

Metro Broadcasting, Inc., sought review of an FCC licensing decision. Rainbow Broadcasting had been given a new television license over Metro because of the FCC's policy on minority ownership; Rainbow Broadcasting was minority owned. Metro Broadcasting claimed that the FCC was violating its equal protection right under the Fifth Amendment in its comparative decision to award Rainbow Broadcasting the license.

Chief Justice William Rehnquist of the U.S. Supreme Court held : "The FCC policies do not violate equal protection, since they bear the imprimatur of longstanding congressional support and direction and are substantially related to the achievement of the important governmental objective of broadcast diversity."

Both the Commissioner and Judge concurred that in regards to the Congress' racial classification policies, they need not be subject to "strict scrutiny".

Also, a precedent case, City of Richmond v. J.A. Croson Co., held that, "Benign race-conscious measures mandated by Congress—even if those measures are not "remedial" in the sense of being designed to compensate victims of past governmental or societal discrimination—are constitutionally permissible to the extent that they serve important governmental objectives within the power of Congress and are substantially related to the achievement of those objectives."

=== FCC Equal Employment Opportunity Regulations 1994 ===
The policy statement released on February 1, 1994 provided clear guidelines by which the Commission would determine and impose sanctions for EEO violations, which in time could create a more consistent body of EEO enforcement precedents.

Under this policy a $12,500 base forfeiture (subject to change) would be imposed on license renewal applicants who fail to recruit or attract an "adequate" pool of minority and female applicants or hires for at least two thirds of all vacancies during the renewal period. However, it was noted that at the time this policy was released, the tern "adequate" was never clearly defined.

The FCC stated that not only would they continue to require licensees to demonstrate that they made adequate efforts to seek minorities and women, but in addition they would be looking at results. Licensees unable to prove that these efforts produced a significant number of minority applicants or interviews would be at greater risk for repercussions.

=== Adarand Constructors, Inc. v. Peña ===
In the case of Adarand Constructors, Inc. v. Peña (1995), the United States Supreme Court overturned Metro Broadcasting, Inc v. FCC in which the Court had stated that Congress' benign minority ownership policies need not be subject to strict scrutiny. The case held that racial classifications imposed by the federal government would be analyzed under a standard of "strict scrutiny".

=== FCC Equal Employment Opportunity Regulations 1997 ===
The FCC adopted its Equal Employment Opportunity (EEO) regulations in 1997, imposing two basic requirements for radio stations. Radio stations are prohibited from discriminating in employment against anyone based on their race, color, religion, national origin, or sex Also, radio stations are required to implement an affirmative action program in order to hire more women and minorities. This EEO program must include a plan for the following:

- Disseminating the equal opportunity program to job applicants and employees
- Using minority and women-specific recruiting sources
- Evaluating the station's employment profile and job turnover against the availability of minorities and women in its recruitment area
- Offering promotions to minorities and women in a nondiscriminatory fashion
- Analyzing its efforts to recruit, hire, and promote minorities and women.

== Initial charge ==
The initial charge brought against the LCMS radio stations was initiated by a Hearing Designation Order and Notice of Opportunity for Hearing for Forfeiture to examine the church's or licensee's compliance with the FCC's equal employment opportunity requirements. The denomination's membership was around 2 percent African American, and because of this, the NAACP challenged the stations' license renewal with the FCC. The Commission questioned the licensee's affirmative recruitment efforts, noting its reasons for failing to recruit had a direct adverse impact on the recruitment of African Americans. In addition to requiring "Lutheran training", a "classical music expertise" was required by the church; however, these requirements were suspect because not all persons hired for specified positions at the two stations had said training or expertise. The FCC also found that the LCMS had made misleading statements about these practices when they claimed to actively seek female and minority referrals to fill vacancies as they occurred.

An FCC administrative law judge found the LCMS's overall affirmative action efforts unsatisfactory during much of its license term, and held that these deficiencies were sufficiently serious to warrant the imposition of EEO misrepresentation, but not severe enough to warrant license non-renewal. The Judge, however, did impose an initial forfeiture of $50,000 for the willful and repeated violation of the FCC's EEO minority recruiting requirements.

The LCMS, upon appeal to the commission, argued that the implication that it did not comply with the commission's EEO requirements violated its constitutional right to religious freedom by improperly evaluating its recruitment efforts and employment criteria. However, the Court of Appeals had held in the past, that the enforcement of the commission's EEO rules do not violate a licensee's constitutional rights.

The commission, the administrative law judge, and the Review Board agreed that the LCMS's recruitment efforts were deficient but because only one of the violations fell within the three-year statute of limitations in effect at that time, the amount of the forfeiture was reduced to $25,000, the maximum fine permitted for a single violation of the commission's rules.

== Ruling ==
On April 14, 1998, the United States Court of Appeals for the District of Columbia Circuit found the FCC's Equal Employment Opportunity program requirements unconstitutional.

The judge presiding over the case, Laurence Silberman, offered an explanation for the court's decision, stating that the FCC based its case on preventing workplace discrimination and promoting diversity of programming. However, the court found that the FCC does not have the authority to declare regulations using an anti-discrimination rationale. This is because the purpose of the FCC is to safeguard the public interest. The court had previously stated that agencies can impose anti-discrimination regulations only when they specifically relate to that agency's statutory charge. Therefore, it holds that the instances in which the FCC has the authority to pass anti-discriminatory measures would be one in which the discrimination in question related to "communication services" - which, in this case, means programming. Another explanation offered by Silberman is that the phrase "diversity of programming" is incredibly vague and any further attempts to identify what that means would put it in conflict with the First Amendment. Therefore, such a concept is not meaningful.

== Response ==
The FCC, the NAACP, and several high-profile civil right leaders voiced strong opposition to the decision, such as in this quote by FCC Commissioner Gloria Tristanion.

I am deeply disappointed by the Court's decision, which I believe was based on a mistaken understanding of our EEO rules and policies. I fully share the Chairman's continued commitment to the goal of ensuring that broadcasters reach out to all segments of the community when filling job vacancies. I look forward to reviewing proposals to revise the outreach rule to address the Court's concerns.

The FCC initially petitioned the District of Columbia District Court for an en banc rehearing of the case with a full court. In a 6–4 vote, the majority of the D.C. Circuit denied the joint petitions for rehearing, and the FCC eventually accepted the rulings.

The Lutheran Church celebrated the decision as a victory for freedom of religious expression. Critics of affirmative action or equal opportunity policies also applauded the decision and subsequent loosening of EEO regulations, claiming "The narrowing of affirmative action is not so much the destruction of a time-honored legal mechanism, but rather a return to the original purpose of the policy."

== Implications ==
This case was one of many that indicated a shift in stance for the federal judiciary, which previously showed deference to the FCC when creating and enforcing EEO and affirmative action policies. As a result, other EEO or affirmative action policies, whether already in place or in the process of being developed, are under a higher level of scrutiny.

As a direct response to the case, the FCC proposed several new EEO rules that would require broadcast licensees to inform women and members of minority groups of job vacancies, and to have an opportunity to apply for openings at broadcast stations. The proposed rules would not contain requirements or quotas for employers to meet regarding the makeup of their workforce relative to the composition of the local labor force, and the FCC would not use such comparisons when assessing those types of EEO programs.

The case also caused effects in other forms of media when the FCC proposed modifications to its EEO rules for cable and MVPD entities in order to maintain consistency.
