= Curtis Taylor =

Curtis Taylor may refer to:

- Curtis Taylor (American football)
- Curtis Taylor (Australian footballer)
- Curtis Taylor (baseball) (born 1995) Canadian baseball pitcher
- Curtis Cavielle Taylor (1896–1967), African American pioneering criminal attorney and civil rights lawyer in Los Angeles, California
