= Wisconsin Department of Revenue v. William Wrigley Jr. Co. =

Wisconsin Dept. of Revenue v. Wrigley Co.
- Supreme Court of the United States

Argued January 22, 1992 Decided June 19, 1992
- Full case name: Wisconsin Department of Revenue v. William Wrigley Jr. Co.
- Citations: 505 U.S. 214 (more) 112 S. Ct. 2447; 120 L. Ed. 2d 174

Case history
- Prior: Certiorari to the Supreme Court of Wisconsin

Holding
- Respondent’s activities in Wisconsin exceeded scope of federal exemption from state taxation.

Court membership
- Chief Justice William Rehnquist Associate Justices Byron White · Harry Blackmun; John P. Stevens · Sandra Day O'Connor; Antonin Scalia · Anthony Kennedy; David Souter · Clarence Thomas

Case opinions
- Majority: Scalia, joined by White, Stevens, Souter, Thomas
- Concurrence: O'Connor
- Dissent: Kennedy, joined by Rehnquist, Blackmun

Laws applied
- 15 USC Sec. 381

Wisconsin Department of Revenue v. William Wrigley Jr. Co., 505 U.S. 214 (1992), is a case decided by the United States Supreme Court regarding the application of state franchise taxes to out-of-state businesses.

== Background ==
In 1980, the Wisconsin Department of Revenue (WDR) decided that the in-state activities of the Wm. Wrigley Jr. Company in selling and supplying retailers with chewing gum exceeded limits defined by Congress in 1961 that exempted foreign corporations from franchise and income taxes in a state as long as their activities were limited to soliciting customers. Wrigley, based in Chicago, neither owned nor leased any real property in the state. Its employees were limited to a regional sales manager, who worked out of his house, and district sales representatives who dealt directly with retailers. The company provided the representatives with cars and reimbursed some of their expenses. Nevertheless, WDR believed that since the sales reps also stored gum and personally resupplied retailers, including replacement of stale gum stocks at no cost, the company did more than just solicit customers in Wisconsin.

Wrigley felt that it was exempt from Wisconsin taxation under the Interstate Income Act of 1959 (15 U.S.C. § 381 et seq.), which provides that "states cannot impose a 'net income tax' on 'any person' if the only contact with a state is limited to the solicitation of orders for sales of tangible personal property". A "legal person" can be an individual or a corporate body.

== Wisconsin calls for taxation ==
Wisconsin believed that the presence of Wrigley in the state was enough to call for a franchise tax. The state believed that Wrigley was not afforded protection under Public Law 86-272, because it violated solicitation by the following practices:

- Recruitment, training, and evaluation of sales employees by regional manager
- Intervention in credit disputes by regional manager
- Use of hotel rooms and homes for sales meetings
- Replacement of stale gum at no cost to retailer
- "Agency stock checks" — billing of retailer for gum supplied from in-state inventory to fill display racks
- Storage of gum in sales representatives' homes or in rented space

== View of litigants ==
The state argued for the narrowest possible view: that any activity beyond “asking the customer to purchase the product” removed the protection of P.L.86-272. It also argued that activities leading up to the sale may be protected, but any activities taking place after the sale are more than solicitation.

Wrigley argued for a broad interpretation: that “solicitation” should encompass all ordinary business activities that generally accompany the solicitation process. According to Wrigley, all activities normally assigned to sales reps should be considered solicitation.

== Result ==
The Court found that Wrigley’s activities in Wisconsin exceeded the provisions of the state code and allowed the imposition of the tax. The Court ruled that the replacement of stale gum, "agency stock checks", and maintenance of inventory for those purposes were not protected, and the Court sided with the Wisconsin Department of Revenue.

== See also ==
- List of United States Supreme Court cases, volume 505
- List of United States Supreme Court cases
- Lists of United States Supreme Court cases by volume
- List of United States Supreme Court cases by the Rehnquist Court
