= Morton v. Mancari =

- Supreme Court of the United States

Argued April 24, 1974 Decided June 17, 1974
- Full case name: Rogers C. B. Morton, Secretary of Interior, et al., Appellants v. C. R. Mancari, et al.
- Citations: 417 U.S. 535 (more) 94 S. Ct. 2474; 41 L. Ed. 2d 290

Holding
- The hiring preferences given by Congress are not violative of the Due Process Clause of the Fifth Amendment.

Court membership
- Chief Justice Warren E. Burger Associate Justices William O. Douglas · William J. Brennan Jr. Potter Stewart · Byron White; Thurgood Marshall · Harry Blackmun; Lewis F. Powell Jr. · William Rehnquist

Case opinion
- Majority: Blackmun, joined by unanimous

Laws applied
- U.S. Const. amend. V

Morton v. Mancari, 417 U.S. 535 (1974), was a United States legal case about the constitutionality, under the Fifth Amendment, of hiring preferences given to Indians within the Bureau of Indian Affairs. The Supreme Court of the United States held that the hiring preferences given by the United States Congress does not violate the Due Process Clause of the Fifth Amendment.

== Background ==
The appellees were a group of non-Indian employees of the Bureau of Indian Affairs (BIA). The Appellees brought this action claiming that the employment preference for qualified Indians in the BIA provided by the Indian Reorganization Act of 1934 also known as the Wheeler-Howard Act, 48 Stat. 984, contravened the anti-discrimination provisions of the Equal Employment Opportunity Act of 1972 and deprived them of property rights without due process of law in violation of the Fifth Amendment. The District Court held that the Indian preference was implicitly repealed by section 11 of the 1972 Act, which prohibited racial discrimination in most federal employment. The court enjoined appellant federal officials from implementing any Indian employment preferences in the BIA. The Supreme Court of the United States granted Certiorari.

== Opinion of the Court ==
The issue in this case was whether the hiring preference policy within the BIA constituted invidious racial discrimination in violation of the Fifth Amendment of the United States Constitution.

The policy of the BIA grants preference at both the hiring and the promotion phase. Given a situation where two individuals are both qualified for a position and one of them is an Indian, the Indian would receive preference over the non-Indian. The District Court found that any hiring preferences previously given by the Indian Reorganization Act of 1934 were implicitly repealed by the Equal Employment Opportunity Act of 1972, 86 Stat. 111, which prohibits discrimination on the basis of race in most federal employment. The Court found that the purpose of the preference was not racially motivated but motivated by the desire to give "Indians a greater participation in their own self-government; to further the Government's trust obligation toward the Indian tribes; and to reduce the negative effect of having non-Indians administer matters that affect Indian tribal life." The goal of the hiring preference was to make the BIA more responsive to the interests of the people it was serving, Indians. The Court found that Congress was well aware that the policy would create disadvantages within the BIA for non-Indians. However, the desire to make the BIA more responsive to Indians as well as creating a program of self-government justifiably outweighed this concern.

Title VII of the Civil Rights Act of 1964, the first major piece of legislation to prohibit discrimination in private employment on the basis of race, color, religion, sex or national origin, specifically exempted preferential treatment of Indians. This, the Court said, showed a clear recognition that Indians had a unique legal status, thus giving this hiring preference more justification.

The Court noted that it is a rare occasion when Congress will implicitly repeal an action, and that typically Congress must specifically do so. The Court went on to find several reasons that Congress did not intend to repeal the hiring preferences for Indians within the BIA.

- First: The exemptions of Indians from the 1964 Civil Rights Act indicated a longstanding policy to give unique legal status to Indians concerning employment on or near the reservation.
- Second: Only three months after Congress enacted the 1972 amendments it also enacted two new Indian preference laws. The Court thought it unlikely for the same Congress to take away an Indian preference and subsequently create two more.
- Third: Preferences given to Indians have, for many years, been treated as exceptions to Executive Orders forbidding Government Employment discrimination. The 1972 amendments simply codified existing anti-discrimination provisions, and there is no reason to believe that Congress intended to get rid of these preferences that had previously co-existed with broad anti-discrimination provisions in Executive Orders.
- Fourth: Repeals by implication are not favored. There is no indication in the legislative history that Congress intended to repeal the preferences previously given to Indians. The court found that the only occasion where repeal by implication is necessary is where two statutes are irreconcilable. This is not the case here.

When the court turned to the due process claim it found:

The hiring preference given here was not "racial discrimination" nor was it even a "racial" preference. The court compared it to the requirement of a Senator being from the state that she represents, or a city council member being required to reside in the area he represents. The Court said, "The preference, as applied, is granted to Indians not as a discrete racial group, but rather, as members of quasi-sovereign tribal entities whose lives and activities are governed by the BIA in a unique fashion." Saying also, "the BIA is truly sui generis." The Court also noted that this preference was reasonably and directly related to a legitimate nonracially based goal, thus preventing it from violating the Constitution.

== See also ==
- Indian Preference
