= Earl Broady =

American judge (1904–1992)

Earl Clifford Broady (1904–1992) was an American judge, attorney, police officer and pianist in Los Angeles. He joined the police department in 1927, later becoming Deputy D.A., and then a judge. Broady lead a jazz ensemble known as Broady's Hot Footers. Broady was hired as Chief Deputy District Attorney by District Attorney Evelle Younger. He was the first African American in upper management in the office. He was a highly respected judge who was regularly assigned high profile and complicated cases.

== Personal life ==
Broady once said, "I not only was born across the tracks. I was born on the wrong side of that place across the tracks." He began working as a janitor at age 13, and in his early years worked as a mail carrier, and was an accomplished pianist and a band leader. Later in life he was known for his philanthropy.

== Career ==
Broady joined the Los Angeles Police Department (LAPD) in 1927. He became one of the first African American police officers to be elevated to the rank of Lieutenant and Watch Commander at the Los Angeles Police Force.

He attended night classes at University of Southern California (USC) and the Los Angeles College of Law, and in 1944 left the LAPD to practice law. He was later elected president of the Criminal Courts Bar Association of Los Angeles, and became Chief Deputy District Attorney for Los Angeles County.

He was appointed to be a judge on the Los Angeles Superior Court on June 7, 1965, where he served until his retirement in 1978. Judge Broady also served on the McCone Commission, which studied the causes behind the Watts riots.

He gave US$1 million to Howard University in honor of Los Angeles lawyer Curtis Cavielle Taylor in whose office Broady started his legal career.
