= Executive Order 10925 =

Establishing the President's Committee on Equal Employment Opportunity

Executive Order 10925, signed by President John F. Kennedy on March 6, 1961, required government contractors, except in special circumstances, to "take affirmative action to ensure that applicants are employed and that employees are treated during employment without regard to their race, creed, color, or national origin". It established the President's Committee on Equal Employment Opportunity (PCEEO), which was chaired by then Vice President Lyndon Johnson. Vice Chair and Secretary of Labor Arthur Goldberg was responsible for the "general supervision and direction" of the Committee's operations. Ten other senior executive appointees also sat on the Committee.

The first draft, written by Goldberg and future Supreme Court justice Abe Fortas, was reviewed by Hobart Taylor Jr. and George Bunn. Based on the perceived inefficacy of President Dwight D. Eisenhower's earlier Executive Orders on civil rights, Taylor and Bunn coined the term "affirmative action" to emphasize that employers must actively combat discrimination, rather than passively addressing claims of workplace discrimination as they arise.

Following passage of the Civil Rights Act of 1964 and President Johnson's 1965 Executive Order 11246, the Committee's functions were divided between the Equal Employment Opportunity Commission (EEOC) and the Office of Federal Contract Compliance (which in 1975 was renamed the Office of Federal Contract Compliance Programs).

== Opposition ==
Opponents of the PCEEO and Executive Order 10925 included Senator J. Lister Hill, a segregationist Democrat from Alabama, who claimed that the committee and the executive order were overreaches by the federal government into the private business of America.

== See also ==
- Executive Order 8802
- Affirmative action in the United States
- Executive order (United States)
