= R.A.V. v. City of St. Paul =

- Supreme Court of the United States

Argued December 4, 1991 Decided June 22, 1992
- Full case name: R.A.V., Petitioner v. City of St. Paul, Minnesota
- Docket no.: 90-7675
- Citations: 505 U.S. 377 (more) 112 S. Ct. 2538; 120 L. Ed. 2d 305; 1992 U.S. LEXIS 3863; 60 U.S.L.W. 4667; 92 Cal. Daily Op. Service 5299; 92 Daily Journal DAR 8395; 6 Fla. L. Weekly Fed. S 479
- Argument: Oral argument

Case history
- Prior: Statute upheld as constitutional and charges reinstated, 464 N.W.2d 507 (Minn. 1991)

Holding
- The St. Paul Bias-Motivated Crime Ordinance was struck down because the regulation was "content-based", proscribing only activities which conveyed messages concerning particular topics. Judgment of the Supreme Court of Minnesota reversed.

Court membership
- Chief Justice William Rehnquist Associate Justices Byron White · Harry Blackmun; John P. Stevens · Sandra Day O'Connor; Antonin Scalia · Anthony Kennedy; David Souter · Clarence Thomas

Case opinions
- Majority: Scalia, joined by Rehnquist, Kennedy, Souter, Thomas
- Concurrence: White (in judgment), joined by Blackmun, O'Connor; Stevens (except Part I-A)
- Concurrence: Blackmun (in judgment)
- Concurrence: Stevens (in judgment), joined by White, Blackmun (Part I)

Laws applied
- U.S. Const., amend. I; St. Paul, Minn., Legis. Code § 292.02 (1990)

R.A.V. v. City of St. Paul, 505 U.S. 377 (1992), is a case in which the Supreme Court of the United States unanimously invalidated Saint Paul, Minnesota's Bias-Motivated Crime Ordinance and reversed the conviction of a teenager for burning a cross on the lawn of an African-American family. The ordinance was held to violate the First Amendment's protection of freedom of speech. The court reasoned that the ordinance constituted viewpoint discrimination that could cause exclusions from the marketplace of ideas. After R.A.V., the government may not pass laws that viewpoint-discriminate within a category of unprotected speech (e.g., fighting words or obscenity) in ways unrelated to the reason the category is unprotected.

== Facts and procedural background ==
In the early morning hours of June 21, 1990, petitioner R.A.V. and several other teenagers allegedly assembled a cross from broken chair legs. The cross was erected and burned in the front yard of a black family who lived across the street from the house where the petitioner was staying. R.A.V., who was a juvenile at the time, was charged with two counts, including a violation of the St. Paul Bias-Motivated Crime Ordinance. The ordinance provided the following:

Whoever places on public or private property, a symbol, object, appellation, characterization or graffiti, including, but not limited to, a burning cross or Nazi swastika, which one knows or has reasonable grounds to know arouses anger, alarm or resentment in others on the basis of race, color, creed, religion or gender commits disorderly conduct and shall be guilty of a misdemeanor.

R.A.V. moved to dismiss the count under the Bias-Motivated Crime Ordinance, arguing that it was substantially overbroad and impermissibly content-based, and therefore invalid under the First Amendment. The trial court granted the motion, but the Minnesota Supreme Court reversed, rejecting petitioner's overbreadth claim because, as the Court had construed the ordinance in prior cases, the phrase "arouses anger, alarm or resentment in others" limited the reach of the ordinance to conduct that amounted to fighting words under the Chaplinsky v. New Hampshire decision. The Minnesota Supreme Court also concluded that the ordinance was not impermissibly content-based because "the ordinance is a narrowly tailored means towards accomplishing the compelling governmental interest in protecting the community against bias-motivated threats to public safety and order." Petitioner appealed, and the Supreme Court of the United States granted certiorari.

== Decision ==
Justice Antonin Scalia delivered the opinion of the Court, which was joined in full by Chief Justice William Rehnquist and Justices Anthony Kennedy, David Souter and Clarence Thomas. Justice Byron White wrote an opinion concurring in the judgment, which was joined in full by Justices Harry Blackmun and Sandra Day O'Connor and in part by Justice John Paul Stevens. Justice Blackmun also wrote an opinion concurring in the judgment. Justice Stevens also wrote an opinion concurring in the judgment, which was joined in part by Justices White and Blackmun.

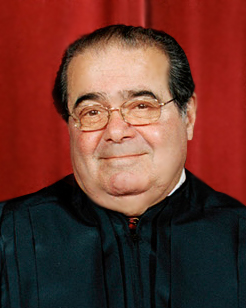
Justice Scalia, who wrote the majority opinion in R.A.V.

=== The majority decision ===
The Supreme Court's decision began with a recitation of the relevant factual and procedural background, noting several times that the conduct at issue could have been prosecuted under different Minnesota statutes. In construing the ordinance, the Court recognized that it was bound by the construction given by the Minnesota Supreme Court. Therefore, the Court accepted the Minnesota court's conclusion that the ordinance reached only those expressions that constitute "fighting words" within the meaning of Chaplinsky v. New Hampshire.

Petitioner argued that the Chaplinsky formulation should be narrowed, such that the ordinance would be invalidated as "substantially overbroad", but the Court declined to consider this argument, concluding that even if all of the expression reached by the ordinance could be proscribed as "fighting words", the ordinance was facially unconstitutional in that it prohibited otherwise permitted speech solely on the basis its subject matter.

The Court began its substantive analysis with a review of the principles of free-speech jurisprudence, beginning with the general rule that the First Amendment prevents the government from proscribing speech, or even expressive conduct, because of disapproval of the ideas expressed. The Court noted that while content-based regulations are presumptively invalid, society has permitted restrictions upon the content of speech in a few limited areas, which are "of such slight social value as a step to truth that any benefit that may be derived from them is clearly outweighed by the social interest in order and morality."

The Court then clarified language from previous free-speech cases, including Roth v. United States, Beauharnais v. Illinois, and Chaplinsky that suggested that certain categories of expression are "not within the area of constitutionally protected speech", and "must be taken in context". The Court's stated that this meant that certain areas of speech "can, consistently with the First Amendment, be regulated because of their constitutionally proscribable content (obscenity, defamation, etc.)—not that they are categories of speech entirely invisible to the Constitution, so that they may be made the vehicles for content discrimination." For example, the government may "proscribe libel, but it may not make the further content discrimination of proscribing only libel critical of the government."

The Court recognized that while a particular utterance of speech can be proscribed on the basis of one feature, the Constitution may prohibit proscribing it on the basis of another feature. Thus, while burning a flag in violation of an ordinance against outdoor fires could be punishable, burning a flag in violation of an ordinance against dishonoring the flag is not. In addition, other reasonable "time, place, or manner" restrictions were upheld, but only if they were "justified without reference to the content of the regulated speech".

The Court recognized two final principles of free-speech jurisprudence. One of these described that when "the entire basis for the content discrimination consists entirely of the very reason the entire class of speech is proscribable, no significant danger of idea or viewpoint discrimination exists." As examples, Justice Scalia wrote,

A State may choose to prohibit only that obscenity which is the most patently offensive in its prurience – i.e., that which involves the most lascivious displays of sexual activity. But it may not prohibit, for example, only that obscenity which includes offensive political messages. And the Federal Government can criminalize only those threats of violence that are directed against the President, since the reasons why threats of violence are outside the First Amendment (protecting individuals from the fear of violence, from the disruption that fear engenders, and from the possibility that the threatened violence will occur) have special force when applied to the person of the President.

The other principle of free-speech jurisprudence was recognized when the Court wrote that a valid basis for according different treatment to a content-defined subclass of proscribable speech is that the subclass "happens to be associated with particular 'secondary effects' of the speech, so that 'the regulation is justified without reference to the content of the ... speech'". As an example, the Court wrote that a state could permit all obscene live performances except those involving minors.

Applying these principles to the St. Paul Bias-Motivated Crime Ordinance, the Court concluded that the ordinance was facially unconstitutional. Justice Scalia explained the rationale, writing,

Although the phrase in the ordinance, "arouses anger, alarm or resentment in others", has been limited by the Minnesota Supreme Court's construction to reach only those symbols or displays that amount to "fighting words", the remaining, unmodified terms make clear that the ordinance applies only to "fighting words" that insult, or provoke violence, "on the basis of race, color, creed, religion or gender." Displays containing abusive invective, no matter how vicious or severe, are permissible unless they are addressed to one of the specified disfavored topics. Those who wish to use "fighting words" in connection with other ideas—to express hostility, for example, on the basis of political affiliation, union membership, or homosexuality—are not covered. The First Amendment does not permit St. Paul to impose special prohibitions on those speakers who express views on disfavored subjects.

The Court explained that, in addition to being an impermissible restriction based on content, the ordinance constituted viewpoint-based discrimination, writing,

As explained earlier, see supra, at 386, the reason why fighting words are categorically excluded from the protection of the First Amendment is not that their content communicates any particular idea, but that their content embodies a particularly intolerable (and socially unnecessary) mode of expressing whatever idea the speaker wishes to convey. St. Paul has not singled out an especially offensive mode of expression—it has not, for example, selected for prohibition only those fighting words that communicate ideas in a threatening (as opposed to a merely obnoxious) manner. Rather, it has proscribed fighting words of whatever manner that communicate messages of racial, gender, or religious intolerance. Selectivity of this sort creates the possibility that the city is seeking to handicap the expression of particular ideas. That possibility would alone be enough to render the ordinance presumptively invalid, but St. Paul's comments and concessions in this case elevate the possibility to a certainty.

Displays containing some words, such as racial slurs, would be prohibited to proponents of all views, whereas fighting words that "do not themselves invoke race, color, creed, religion, or gender—aspersions upon a person's mother, for example—would seemingly be usable ad libitum in the placards of those arguing in favor of racial, color, etc., tolerance and equality, but could not be used by those speakers' opponents." The Court concluded that "St. Paul has no such authority to license one side of a debate to fight freestyle, while requiring the other to follow Marquess of Queensberry rules."

The Court concluded, "Let there be no mistake about our belief that burning a cross in someone's front yard is reprehensible. But St. Paul has sufficient means at its disposal to prevent such behavior without adding the First Amendment to the fire."

== Limitation ==
In Virginia v. Black (2003), the United States Supreme Court deemed constitutional part of a Virginia statute outlawing the public burning of a cross if done with an intent to intimidate, noting that such expression "has a long and pernicious history as a signal of impending violence."

== See also ==
- List of United States Supreme Court cases, volume 505
- List of United States Supreme Court cases
- Lists of United States Supreme Court cases by volume
- List of United States Supreme Court cases by the Rehnquist Court
