= Franklin v. Massachusetts =

- Supreme Court of the United States

Argued April 21, 1992 Decided June 26, 1992
- Full case name: Franklin, Secretary of Commerce, et al. v. Massachusetts et al.
- Citations: 505 U.S. 788 (more)

Holding
- 1. An agency action is "final" when an agency completes its decisionmaking process and the result of that process is one that will directly affect the parties; 2. The President's actions are not reviewable under the APA.

Court membership
- Chief Justice William Rehnquist Associate Justices Byron White · Harry Blackmun; John P. Stevens · Sandra Day O'Connor; Antonin Scalia · Anthony Kennedy; David Souter · Clarence Thomas

Case opinions
- Majority: O'Connor, joined by Rehnquist, White, Scalia, Thomas (Parts I and II); Rehnquist, White, Blackmun, Stevens, Kennedy, Souter, Thomas (Part IV); Rehnquist, White, Thomas (Part III, not for a majority)
- Concurrence: Stevens (concurrence in part and in judgment), joined by Blackmun, Kennedy, Souter
- Concurrence: Scalia (concurrence in part and in judgment), joined by Thomas

Laws applied
- Administrative Procedure Act

Franklin v. Massachusetts, 505 U.S. 788 (1992), was a United States Supreme Court case regarding the 1990 Census. It is most notable in U.S. administrative law for its holding that the Administrative Procedure Act does not authorize statutory review of actions delegated by Congress to the president of the United States.

Even beyond the Census, this includes many important delegations to the president by Congress, especially powers relating to war, national emergencies, immigration, trade, and federal lands.

Section 704 allows judicial review of "final agency action," but the Court held that the President does not count as an agency as defined in sections 551(1) and 701(b)(1), which do not explicitly mention the President.

== Background ==
In conducting the 1990 Census, the U.S. Department of Commerce decided to count overseas federal employees — mostly military personnel — as living at their "home of record" in the United States. This resulted in Massachusetts losing one seat in the House of Representatives in favor of the State of Washington. Massachusetts sued the secretary of commerce, Barbara Franklin. Massachusetts claimed that this violated the Census Clause of the Constitution, which requires an "actual Enumeration" of people "in each State". It also brought a statutory claim under the Administrative Procedure Act, which allow judicial review of "final agency action" that is "arbitrary and capricious". The APA states a number of exceptional entities that are not agencies, including Congress, and it does not specify that the president is an exception.

== Supreme Court ==
In a majority opinion by Justice Sandra Day O'Connor, the Supreme Court unanimously rejected the constitutional challenge. As to the Administrative Procedure Act, however, the majority was more narrow. Four other justices joined O'Connor in holding the final agency action at issue was an action of the president, not the secretary of commerce, and that the APA does not authorize judicial review of final actions delegated by Congress to the president. In this case, the Supreme Court said the president is not an agency under the meaning of the APA.

== See also ==
- Dalton v. Specter (1994)
