= Curtis Cavielle Taylor =

American lawyer (1896–1967)

Curtis Cavielle Taylor (1896–1967) was an African American pioneering criminal attorney and civil rights lawyer. He was nicknamed, "The Black Clarence Darrow". Taylor lived in Los Angeles, California.

== Biography ==
Curtis Cavielle Taylor was born in 1896 in Edna, Jackson County, Texas. His cousin was Hobart Taylor. He graduated from Prairie View A&M University (1917); and Howard University Law School (1926).

Taylor was admitted to the State Bar of California in March 1927 and opened up a private legal practice in Los Angeles. He wrote a news column, "Pertinent Personalities" for The Pacific Defender newspaper around 1927. He married Lotus Blossom Roberts on April 11, 1940 in Yuma, Arizona.

His involvement in the Rush Griffin murder case of 1934, led to a statute regarding stays for capital cases in California. He was one of the lawyers in 1938 for George Farley, who killed two Deputy Marshals when they came to his house to evict him. In 1958, Taylor was shot in his office by Warren Willie Stroud. Taylor was representing Stroud's wife who was filing a court case for spousal abuse. He survived the shooting.

In 1959, Taylor was honored with the alumni award during the convocation address at Prairie View A&M University. Judge Earl C. Broady, who began his legal career working in Taylor's office, gave a million dollar gift to Howard University in 1987 in his honor. The UCLA Library has numerous photos of him with other prominent African Americans in their archival collection.

== Death and legacy ==
Taylor died in September 1967 at Sawtelle Veterans Administration Hospital in Los Angeles, California.
