= Hopwood v. Texas =

1996 U.S. court case

- Court: United States Court of Appeals for the Fifth Circuit
- Full case name: Cheryl J. Hopwood, et al v. State of Texas, et al
- Decided: March 18, 1996
- Citations: 78 F.3d 932; 64 USLW 2591; 107 Ed. Law Rep. 552

Case history
- Prior history: 861 F. Supp. 551 (W.D. Tex. 1994)
- Subsequent history: Abrogated by Grutter v. Bollinger, 539 U.S. 306 (2003), itself abrogated by Students for Fair Admissions, Inc. v. President and Fellows of Harvard College, No. 20-1199, 600 U.S. ___ (2023).

Court membership
- Judges sitting: Jerry Edwin Smith, Jacques L. Wiener, Jr., Harold R. DeMoss Jr.

Case opinions
- Majority: Smith, joined by DeMoss
- Concurrence: Wiener

Laws applied
- Equal Protection Clause

Hopwood v. Texas, 78 F.3d 932 (5th Cir. 1996), was the first successful legal challenge to a university's affirmative action policy in student admissions since Regents of the University of California v. Bakke. In Hopwood, four white plaintiffs who had been rejected from University of Texas at Austin's School of Law challenged the institution's admissions policy on equal protection grounds and prevailed. After seven years as a precedent in the U.S. Court of Appeals for the Fifth Circuit, the Hopwood decision was abrogated by the U.S. Supreme Court in 2003.

== The case ==
After being rejected by the University of Texas School of Law in 1992, Cheryl J. Hopwood filed a federal lawsuit against the University on September 29, 1992, in the U.S. District Court for the Western District of Texas. Hopwood, a white woman, was denied admission to the law school despite being better qualified (at least under certain metrics) than many admitted minority candidates. Originally, Hopwood's co-plaintiff was Stephanie C. Haynes, but Haynes was dismissed from the suit on February 11, 1993. Ultimately, three white males, Douglas Carvell, Kenneth Elliott, and David Rogers, joined the existing lawsuit as plaintiffs. All had better combined LSAT and grade scores than 36 of the 43 Latinos admitted, and 16 of the 18 black students admitted. U.S. District Judge Sam Sparks, a 1963 graduate of the University of Texas School of Law, presided over the case.

Texas Monthly editor Paul Burka later described Cheryl Hopwood as "the perfect plaintiff to question the fairness of reverse discrimination" because of her academic credentials and her personal hardships (she has a young daughter suffering from a muscular disease).

After an eight-day bench trial in May 1994, Judge Sparks issued his ruling on August 19, 1994. He determined that the university could continue to use the racial preferences which had been at issue in the litigation. In his ruling, he noted that while it was "regrettable that affirmative action programs are still needed in our society", they were still "a necessity" until society could overcome its legacy of institutional racism. Thereupon, the four plaintiffs appealed the case to the Fifth Circuit Court of Appeals, which heard oral arguments in the case on August 8, 1995.

Nearly two years after the original trial, on March 18, 1996, the Fifth Circuit issued its opinion, which was written by Circuit Judge Jerry Edwin Smith. The court held that "the University of Texas School of Law may not use race as a factor in deciding which applicants to admit in order to achieve a diverse student body, to combat the perceived effects of a hostile environment at the law school, to alleviate the law school's poor reputation in the minority community, or to eliminate any present effects of past discrimination by actors other than the law school". Judge Jacques L. Wiener, Jr., concurred. Rehearing was denied on April 4, 1996.

The university appealed the decision to the U.S. Supreme Court, which declined to review the case on July 1, 1996. In an opinion on the denial of certiorari, Justice Ruth Bader Ginsburg, joined by Justice David Souter, noted that the issue of the constitutionality of race in admission was "an issue of great national importance". However, Justice Ginsburg explained that the university was no longer defending the specific admissions policy that had been at issue in the lawsuit and was rather attempting to justify only the rationale for maintaining a race-based admissions policy. Accordingly, because the Supreme Court reviews judgments and not opinions, Justice Ginsburg stated that it "must await a final judgment on a program genuinely in controversy before addressing the important question raised in this petition". Thus, the Hopwood decision became the final law of the land with respect to the use of race in admissions in Louisiana, Mississippi, and Texas, the three states over which the Fifth Circuit has jurisdiction.

== The reaction ==
University officials were not pleased with the opinion. Shortly after the opinion's release, UT President Robert Berdahl predicted "the virtual resegregation of higher education," while UT System Chancellor William Cunningham noted that administrators were "saddened by the 5th Circuit's sweeping determination that Bakke is no longer the law of the land and that past discrimination and diversity no longer justify affirmative action in admissions".

The Fifth Circuit's opinion catalyzed a discussion of race in admissions on campus. Faculty and students protested. For the next several years, the case was a popular topic of discussion and debate in The Daily Texan, the university's student newspaper.

The Texas legislature passed the Top Ten Percent Rule governing admissions into public colleges in the state, partly in order to mitigate some of the effects of the Hopwood decision.

== Later developments ==
On January 15, 1997, William P. Hobby, Jr., former Lieutenant Governor of Texas and then Chancellor of the University of Houston System, sought a clarification of the application of Hopwood from Texas Attorney General Dan Morales. Specifically, Hobby questioned how the new federal jurisprudence would affect financial aid at institutions of higher education in Texas (and in particular, its effect on specific programs of the University of Houston—mainly admissions to the University of Houston Law Center). On February 5, 1997, Morales issued his formal opinion in response to Hobby's request. Morales found that "Hopwood's restrictions would generally apply to all internal institutional policies, including admissions, financial aid, scholarships, fellowships, recruitment and retention, among others". Thus, under the Morales interpretation, Hopwood was extended to prevent the consideration of race in areas beyond admissions.

On June 23, 2003, the Supreme Court abrogated Hopwood in Grutter v. Bollinger, in which the high court found that the United States Constitution "does not prohibit the law school's narrowly tailored use of race in admissions decisions to further a compelling interest in obtaining the educational benefits that flow from a diverse student body". The ruling means that universities in the Fifth Circuit's jurisdiction can again use race as a factor in admissions (as long as quotas are not used, per Gratz v. Bollinger).
