= Executive Order 10308 =

1951 order by President Harry S. Truman

Executive Order 10308 was signed by President Harry S. Truman on December 3, 1951. It was titled Improving the Means for Obtaining Compliance With the Nondiscrimination Provisions of Federal Contracts. It was replaced by Executive Order 10479 in 1953.
