= Indian Preference =

Indian Preference, also known as Indian Preference in hiring, refers to employment policies which aim to increase representation of American Indians within certain workplaces, particularly within organizations dedicated to the welfare of American Indians. Not all federal agencies use Indian Preference. Indian Preference is used by US federal agencies such as the Bureau of Indian Affairs and the Indian Health Service. Applicants for Indian Preference must be citizens of federally recognized American Indian tribes, or descendants of those tribes who meet specific criteria.

== History ==
Indian Preference was first developed during the New Deal period, evolving from the Indian Reorganization Act of 1934. The intent of Indian Preference was to improve Indian self-government, self-representation, and welfare.

The Supreme Court of the United States has ruled that Indian Preference is not a form of racial discrimination under Title VII of the Civil Rights Act of 1964, as being American Indian is not a race, but a political status.

Federal agencies that use Indian Preference include the Bureau of Indian Affairs, the Indian Health Service, the United States Office of Personnel Management, the Morris K. Udall and Stewart L. Udall Foundation, the United States Department of Agriculture, and the White House Initiative for American Indian and Alaskan Native Education.

== See also ==
- Affirmative action in the United States
- Diversity, equity, and inclusion
- Self-governance
- Tribal sovereignty in the United States
