= List of United States Supreme Court cases, volume 505 =

This is a list of all the United States Supreme Court cases from volume 505 of the United States Reports:

Case name	Citation	Date decided
Nordlinger v. Hahn	505 U.S. 1	1992
Georgia v. McCollum	505 U.S. 42	1992
Kraft Gen. Foods, Inc. v. Iowa Dept. of Revenue	505 U.S. 71	1992
Gade v. Nat'l Solid Wastes Management Ass'n	505 U.S. 88	1992
Forsyth Cnty. v. Nationalist Movement	505 U.S. 123	1992
New York v. United States	505 U.S. 144	1992
Wisconsin Dept. of Revenue v. William Wrigley, Jr., Co.	505 U.S. 214	1992
American Nat'l Red Cross v. S.G.	505 U.S. 247	1992
Wright v. West	505 U.S. 277	1992
United States v. Salerno	505 U.S. 317	1992
Sawyer v. Whitley	505 U.S. 333	1992
R.A.V. v. City of St. Paul	505 U.S. 377	1992
Medina v. California	505 U.S. 437	1992
Estate of Cowart v. Nicklos Drilling Co.	505 U.S. 469	1992
Cipollone v. Liggett Group, Inc.	505 U.S. 504	1992
Burlington v. Dague	505 U.S. 557	1992
Lee v. Weisman	505 U.S. 577	1992
Doggett v. United States	505 U.S. 647	1992
International Soc'y for Krishna Consciousness, Inc. v. Lee	505 U.S. 672	1992
United States v. Fordice	505 U.S. 717	1992
Two Pesos, Inc. v. Taco Cabana, Inc.	505 U.S. 763	1992
Franklin v. Massachusetts	505 U.S. 788	1992
Lee v. International Soc'y for Krishna Consciousness, Inc.	505 U.S. 830	1992
Planned Parenthood of Southeastern Pa. v. Casey	505 U.S. 833	1992
Lucas v. South Carolina Coastal Council	505 U.S. 1003	1992
Espinosa v. Florida	505 U.S. 1079	1992
