= United States v. Fordice =

- Supreme Court of the United States

Argued November 13, 1991 Decided June 26, 1992
- Full case name: United States v. Fordice
- Citations: 505 U.S. 717 (more) 112 S. Ct. 2727, 120 L. Ed. 2d 575, 1992 U.S. LEXIS 4534

Case history
- Prior: Ayers v. Allain, 674 F. Supp. 1523 (N.D. Miss. 1987); reversed, 893 F.2d 732 (5th Cir. 1990); rehearing en banc granted, 898 F.2d 1014 (5th Cir.1990); District Court ruling upheld on rehearing en banc, 914 F.2d 676 (5th Cir. 1990); cert. granted, 499 U.S. 958 (1991).

Holding
- The eight public universities in Mississippi had not sufficiently integrated and that the state must take action to change this under the Equal Protection Clause. The system was not declared unconstitutional; simply the court ruled that more action needed to be taken to ensure integration.

Court membership
- Chief Justice William Rehnquist Associate Justices Byron White · Harry Blackmun; John P. Stevens · Sandra Day O'Connor; Antonin Scalia · Anthony Kennedy; David Souter · Clarence Thomas

Case opinions
- Majority: White, joined by Rehnquist, Blackmun, Stevens, O'Connor, Kennedy, Souter, Thomas
- Concurrence: O'Connor
- Concurrence: Thomas
- Concur/dissent: Scalia

United States v. Fordice, 505 U.S. 717 (1992), is a United States Supreme Court case that resulted in an eight to one ruling that the eight public universities in Mississippi had not sufficiently integrated and that the state must take affirmative action to change this under the Equal Protection Clause. The Court found that, although the state had eliminated explicit prohibitions on the admission of black students to institutions including the University of Mississippi, Mississippi State University, and the University of Southern Mississippi, the Court of Appeals had not properly reviewed the set of discriminatory policies used by the state to suppress black enrollment at these schools. On this point, the Court stated that "[i]f the State perpetuates policies and practices traceable to its prior system that continue to have segregative effects – whether by influencing student enrollment decisions or by fostering segregation in other facets of the university system – and such policies are without sound educational justification and can be practicably eliminated, the State has not satisfied its burden of proving that it has dismantled its prior system."

Four opinions were filed in the case. In addition to Justice White's majority opinion, Justice O'Connor and Justice Thomas filed concurring opinions. Thomas, in particular, expressed a concern that the strict review of policies that divided students by race should not be used against historically black universities in the state.

Justice Scalia filed a separate opinion concurring in part and dissenting in part, expressing his disagreement with the burden that the Court imposed on universities and his concern that the standards set forth by the Court would create confusion and lead to more litigation.

== See also ==
- List of United States Supreme Court cases, volume 505
- List of United States Supreme Court cases
- Lists of United States Supreme Court cases by volume
- List of United States Supreme Court cases by the Rehnquist Court
