= Hobart Taylor Jr. =

American lawyer

Hobart T. Taylor Jr
- Born: December 17, 1920; Texarkana, Texas, U.S.
- Died: April 2, 1981 (aged 60); Lyford Cay, New Providence Island, The Bahamas
- Education: Prairie View Normal and Industrial College (BA); Howard University (MA); University of Michigan Law School (JD)
- Occupations: Civil servant; attorney

Hobart T. Taylor Jr. (December 17, 1920 – April 2, 1981) was an American attorney and civil servant who was Special Legal Counsel and the Executive Vice Chairman of the President's Committee on Equal Employment Opportunities, the forerunner to the Equal Employment Opportunity Commission from 1961 to 1965. He was the first non-white person to direct the staff of a presidential commission. He is credited with coining the phrase "affirmative action". He was appointed Associate Special Counsel to the President in 1964, making him one of the highest-ranking African Americans in the US government. He left the commission and the White House staff in 1965 to become a director of the Export–Import Bank of the United States, serving until 1968.

== Early life and early career ==
Hobart Taylor Jr. was born on December 17, 1920, in Texarkana, Texas, to Hobart T. Taylor Sr. and his wife, Charlotte (née Wallace). His father, Hobart T. Taylor Sr., was a self-made millionaire who made his fortune in the insurance industry, taxicab business, and real estate. His cousin was noted lawyer, Curtis Cavielle Taylor. About 1930, the family relocated to Houston, Texas, where young Hobart graduated from Yates High School.

He was a close associate of Lyndon B. Johnson, a Democratic Party activist, and civil rights activist who financed the lawsuit in the 1935 case Grovey v. Townsend, in which all-white primaries in Texas were held to be unconstitutional by the Supreme Court.

He received his bachelor's degree in economics from Prairie View Normal and Industrial College in Prairie View, Texas in 1939. He then enrolled at Howard University in Washington, D.C., where he received his master's degree in economics in 1941. He then attended the University of Michigan Law School, where he received his J.D. and LLB degrees in 1943. He edited the Michigan Law Review while in law school, being the first African American to edit the journal.

Taylor was admitted to the State Bar of Michigan in 1944. He found employment in 1944 as a research clerk for Raymond Wesley Starr, then Chief Justice of the Michigan Supreme Court. He worked for the Chief Justice until 1945 before entering private practice. He then worked as an assisting prosecuting attorney for Wayne County, Michigan, from 1949 to 1950, before becoming corporation counsel for Wayne County in 1950. Taylor left county employment in 1958 to return to private practice at Taylor, Patrick, Bailer & Lee. As of February 1961, however, Taylor was the head of the civil division of the Wayne County district attorney's office. Throughout the 1950s, he also performed legal work for several corporations in Texas.

Taylor and his father both made substantial monetary contributions to the 1954 reelection race of Senator Lyndon B. Johnson, and again to Johnson's presidential campaign in 1960. (Note: The elder Taylor had first donated to Johnson in 1948.) In April 1959, John F. Kennedy visited the United Negro College Fund's convocation in Indianapolis, Indiana, as part of his 1960 presidential campaign, but Hobart T. Taylor Sr., director of the UNCF, and his son maintained their support from Johnson until the 1960 Democratic National Convention.

== Federal government service ==
In February 1961, Taylor was invited to the White House by Vice President Johnson review an early draft of Executive Order 10925 created by Abe Fortas and Secretary of Labor Arthur Goldberg. Aided by George Bunn, Taylor coined the term "affirmative action" in the final version to emphasize that employers must actively combat discrimination, rather than passively addressing claims of workplace discrimination as they arise. The term was added to address the perceived inefficacy of President Dwight D. Eisenhower's earlier Executive Orders on civil rights.

On April 14, 1961, Taylor was named Special Counsel to the newly-formed President's Committee on Equal Employment Opportunities (PCEEO). While Taylor was initially chosen to be Executive Director, conservative Texans voiced opposition to a liberal African American from Michigan leading the committee, so John G. Field took the position. Taylor was ultimately promoted to become the PCEEO's Executive Vice Chairman on September 10, 1962, as the first non-white person to lead a US presidential committee.

Senator Richard Russell Jr. had previously prohibited President Harry S. Truman from financing equal employment efforts with contingency funds, so Taylor anticipated Democratic opposition to dedicated appropriations and instead sought funding from the Department of Labor's existing budget.

Responding to the National Urban League's criticisms of the federal government for providing Lockheed Martin with a $2 billion defense contract despite the company's discriminatory hiring policies, PCEEO Chairman Robert Troutman and Taylor developed Kennedy's July 1961 "Plans for Progress," in which the federal government announced agreements with the country's largest employers to open up more positions to racial minorities.

On April 4, 1964, President Johnson appointed Taylor to the position of Associate Special Counsel to the President. The appointment made Taylor one of the highest-ranking African Americans in the US government. Taylor continued to serve as Executive Vice Chairman of PCEEO, and played an important role in helping to implement the Civil Rights Act of 1964.

Taylor resigned his PCEEO and White House positions on August 25, 1965, when President Johnson appointed him a director of the Export-Import Bank. His nomination was approved by the United States Senate on September 2, 1965.

== Retirement and death ==
Taylor resigned his directorship at the Export-Import Bank on January 22, 1968, and returned to private practice of the law. He joined the D.C. law firm of Dawson, Riddell, Taylor, Davis and Holroyd, then left in 1980 to become counsel for Jones, Day, Reavis and Pogue. He also served on the board of directors of a wide range of corporations, including Aetna Life and Casualty Company, Burroughs Corporation, Eastern Air Lines, The Great Atlantic and Pacific Tea Company, Standard Oil of Ohio, Urban National Corporation, and Westinghouse Electric Corporation.

Taylor served for short periods of time in two federal government commissions, the 1977 Commission on Postal Service and the 1979 Commission on Executive Exchange.

He was a member of the Democratic National Committee, a trustee of the NAACP, and vice chairman and trustee of the Wolf Trap Foundation for the Performing Arts.

Hobart Taylor suffered from amyotrophic lateral sclerosis, and he died of the disease on April 2, 1981, while staying at Lyford Cay on the island of New Providence in The Bahamas. Upon his death, Taylor granted the John F. Kennedy Presidential Library publication rights to a 1967 interview, in which he offered retrospective comments on his work for the federal government.

== Personal life ==
Taylor married Lynette Dobbins of Birmingham, Alabama, on January 26, 1950. Lyndon Johnson became the first President of the United States to dance with an African American woman at an inaugural ball when he danced with Lynette Dobbins Taylor on January 20, 1965. The couple had two children, Hobart III and Albert. The Taylors divorced in 1975.

Taylor married Carol Angermeir in 1978. He became stepfather to her children, Edward Rader and Teresa Warner.

== Bibliography ==
- The Annual Obituary 1981. Chicago: St. James Press. 1982. ISBN 9780912289519.
- Booker, Simeon; Booker, Carol McCabe (2013). Shocking the Conscience: A Reporter's Account of the Civil Rights Movement. Jackson, Miss.: University Press of Mississippi. ISBN 9781617037894.
- Reed, Susan E. (2011). The Diversity Index: The Alarming Truth About Diversity in Corporate America and What Can Be Done About It. New York: AMACOM. ISBN 9780814416495.
- Richardson, Christopher M.; Luker, Ralph (2014). "Taylor, Hobart Jr.". Historical Dictionary of the Civil Rights Movement. Lanham, Md.: Rowman & Littlefield. ISBN 9780810860643.
- Who's Who of American Women. Chicago: Marquis Who's Who. 1975. ISBN 9780837904092.
