= Revised Philadelphia Plan =

Affirmative action program in the United States

The Revised Philadelphia Plan, often called the Philadelphia Plan, required government contractors in Philadelphia to hire minority workers, under the authority of Executive Order 11246. Declared illegal in 1968, a revised version was successfully defended by the Nixon administration and its allies in Congress against those who saw it as an illegal quota program. US Department of Labor Assistant Secretary for Wage and Labor Standards Arthur Fletcher implemented the plan in 1969 based on an earlier plan developed in 1967 by the Office of Federal Contract Compliance and the Philadelphia Federal Executive Board. The plan required federal contractors to meet certain goals for the hiring of minority employees by specific dates in order to combat institutionalized discrimination on the part of specific skilled building trades unions. The plan was quickly extended to other cities.

In 1971, the Contractors Association of Eastern Pennsylvania challenged the plan and Executive Order 11246 by arguing that it was beyond the President's constitutional authority, that it was inconsistent with Titles VI and VII of the Civil Rights Act of 1964 and that it was inconsistent with the National Labor Relations Act. The United States Court of Appeals for the Third Circuit rejected the challenges and the US Supreme Court declined to hear the case, Contractors Association of Eastern Pennsylvania v. Secretary of Labor, in October.

Although it had some success at integrating the building trades, the Philadelphia Plan ultimately had little impact on the problem of African American unemployment in the city. It also contributed to the fracturing of the New Deal coalition, paving the way for the realignment of US politics and the rise of the Sixth Party System.

== See also ==
- Affirmative action
- Ethnic penalty
