= Equal Employment Opportunity Act of 1972 =

United States law

- Long title: An act to further promote equal employment opportunities for American workers
- Enacted by: the 92nd United States Congress

Citations
- Public law: Pub. L. 92–261
- Statutes at Large: 86 Stat. 103

Codification
- Acts amended: Civil Rights Act of 1964
- Titles amended: Title 5: Government Organization and Employees; Title 42: Public Health and Welfare
- U.S.C. sections amended: 42 U.S.C. §§ 2000e–2000e-8; 5 U.S.C. § 5108

Legislative history
- Introduced in the House as H.R. 1746 by Augustus Hawkins (D–CA); Passed the House on September 16, 1971 (285–106); Signed into law by President Richard Nixon on March 24, 1972

United States Supreme Court cases
- Morton v. Mancari, 417 U.S. 535 (1974)

The Equal Employment Opportunity Act of 1972 is a United States federal law which amends Title VII of the Civil Rights Act of 1964 to strengthen protections against employment discrimination. It prohibits discrimination in the workplace based on race, color, national origin, sex, religion, age, disability, and marital or familial status. Specifically, it empowers the Equal Employment Opportunity Commission to take enforcement action against individuals, employers, and labor unions which violated the employment provisions of the 1964 Act, and expanded the jurisdiction of the commission as well. It also requires employers to make reasonable accommodation for the religious practices of employees.

== Background ==
The passage of the Civil Rights Act of 1964 was done with what would turn out to be a flaw in its Title VII. This specific Title was meant to protect against discrimination in the workplace. Unfortunately, it originally failed to fully do so. The agency with which was tasked to address these matters was the Equal Employment Opportunity Commission (EEOC). The problem that occurred was that the EEOC had little power to enforce the laws it was created to protect. This is where the Equal Employment Opportunity Act of 1972 comes into play, providing further protections to employees, more fairness in the enforcement, and importantly giving the EEOC the right to sue employers for Title VII infringements. Thus, making this act a landmark amendment to Title VII of the Civil Rights act of 1964.

== Legislative history ==
The Equal Employment Opportunity Act of 1972 was originally introduced in Congress by cosponsors Senator Harrison Williams (D-NJ) and Representative Augustus Hawkins (D-CA). The purpose of the bill was to strengthen and amend Title VII of the Civil Rights Act of 1964. The bill would eventually come to pass the Senate on November 5th, 1971, and the House on February 8th, 1972. Ultimately, it was signed into law on March 24th, 1972. There were numerous debates during the bill's time in Congress regarding which employees the expansion would cover, what enforcement mechanism the Equal Employment Opportunity Commission (EEOC) would be granted, and whether or not to concentrate power in the EEOC in the first place.

== Provisions ==
The employment provisions of the 1964 Act only applied to firms with 25 or more employees; the 1972 Act extended that to firms with 15 or more employees. The version of the bill reported out of the House Committee on Education and Labor would have decreased the threshold to eight employees; however, some senators, including Norris Cotton (R-NH), Paul Fannin (R-AZ), and John C. Stennis (D-MS), expressed concern for the impact on small businesses. During the debate on the initial version of Title VII in 1964, Cotton in particular had proposed increasing the threshold to 100 employees. Despite support for the eight-employee threshold from other senators such as Jacob Javits (R-NY), the Senate amended the threshold to fifteen, and the House subsequently agreed in conference. The fifteen-employee threshold remains in place as of 2025. Other notable provisions include giving the Equal Employment Opportunity Commission (EEOC) the right to sue employers infringing upon Title VII of the Civil Rights Act of 1964 and expanded coverage of Title VII to State Governments, Local Governments, Educational Institutions, and Labor Unions.

== Impact ==
A 1998 study based on Current Population Survey data found that there were "large shifts in the employment and pay practices of the industries most affected" by the 1972 Act, and concluded that it had "a positive impact" on African Americans' labor market status. With regards to government employment, a 1978 study found that the act had little impact on employment of African Americans in the higher levels of the federal civil service. Overall, however, the act has been able to give the Equal Employment Opportunity Commission (EEOC) real enforcement power, expanded coverage of protections to millions more employees, and increased the amount of compliance from employers.
