= Anti-racism =

Opposition to racism

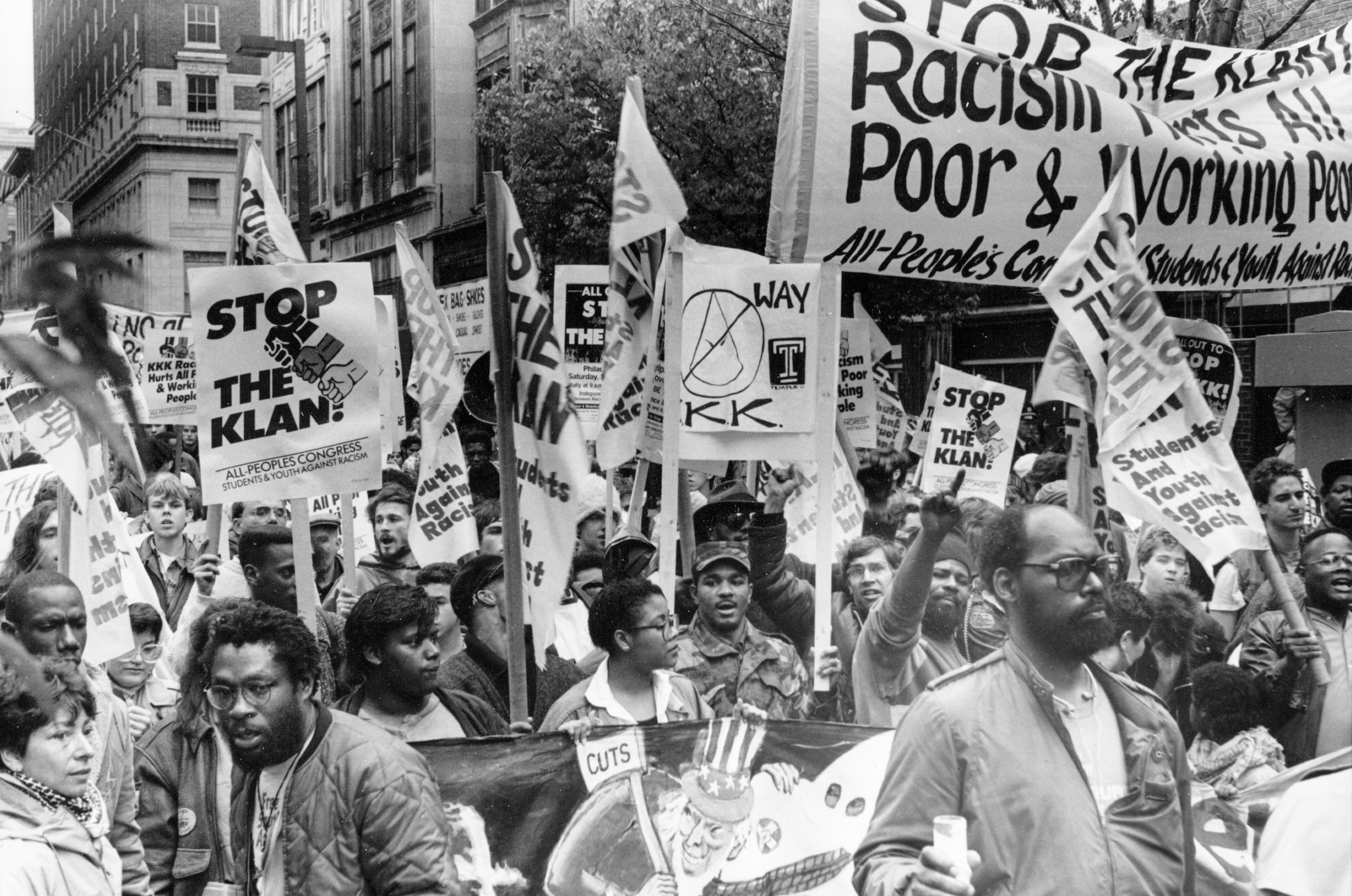
Anti–Ku Klux Klan march in Philadelphia, 1988

Anti-racism encompasses a range of ideas and political actions which are meant to counter racial prejudice, systemic racism, and the oppression of specific racial groups. Anti-racism is usually structured around conscious efforts and deliberate actions which are intended to create equal opportunities for all people on both an individual and a systemic level. As a philosophy, it can be engaged in by the acknowledgment of personal privileges, confronting acts as well as systems of racial discrimination and/or working to change personal racial biases. Major contemporary anti-racism efforts include the Black Lives Matter movement and workplace anti-racism.

== History ==
=== European origins ===
European racism was spread to the Americas by the Europeans, who had used slaves as unpaid workers, but establishment views were questioned when they were applied to indigenous peoples. After the discovery of the New World, many of the members of the clergy who were sent to the New World who were educated in the new humane values of the Renaissance, still new in Europe and not ratified by the Vatican, began to criticize Spain's as well as their own Church's treatment and views of indigenous peoples and slaves.

In December 1511, Antonio de Montesinos, a Dominican friar, was the first European to rebuke openly the Spanish authorities and administrators of Hispaniola for their "cruelty and tyranny" in dealing with the American natives and those forced to labor as slaves. King Ferdinand enacted the Laws of Burgos and Valladolid in response. Enforcement was lax, and the New Laws of 1542 have to be made to take a stronger line. Because some people like Fray Bartolomé de las Casas questioned not only the Crown but the Papacy at the Valladolid Controversy whether the Indigenous were truly men who deserved baptism, Pope Paul III in the papal bull Veritas Ipsa or Sublimis Deus (1537) confirmed that the Indigenous and other races are fully rational human beings who have rights to freedom and private property, even if they are heathen. Afterward, their Christian conversion effort gained momentum along social rights, while leaving the same status recognition unanswered for Africans of Black Race, and legal social racism prevailed towards the Indians or Asians. By then, the last schism of the Reformation had taken place in Europe in those few decades along political lines, and the different views on the value of human lives of different races were not corrected in the lands of Northern Europe, which would join the Colonial race at the end of the century and over the next, as the Portuguese and Spanish Empires waned. It would take another century, with the influence of the French Empire at its height, and its consequent Enlightenment developed at the highest circles of its Court, to return these previously inconclusive issues to the forefront of the political discourse championed by many intellectual men since Rousseau. These issues gradually permeated to the lower social levels, where they were a reality lived by men and women of different races from the European racial majority.

=== Quaker initiatives ===
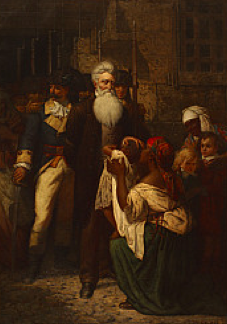
John Brown's blessing

In 1688, German immigrants to the Province of Pennsylvania issued an anti-slavery petition opposing slavery in the colony. After being set aside and forgotten, it was rediscovered by American abolitionists in 1844, misplaced around the 1940s, and once more rediscovered in March 2005. Prior to the American Revolution, a small group of Quakers, including John Woolman and Anthony Benezet, persuaded many fellow Quakers to emancipate their slaves, divest from the Atlantic slave trade and create unified Quaker policies against slavery. This afforded the religious denomination a measure of moral authority to help begin the American abolitionist movement. Woolman died of smallpox in England in 1775, shortly after crossing the Atlantic to spread his anti-slavery message to the Quakers of the British Isles.

During and after the American Revolution, Quaker ministrations and preachings against slavery began to spread beyond their denomination. In 1783, 300 Quakers, chiefly from London, presented the British Parliament with a petition against the Britain's involvement in the Atlantic slave trade. In 1785, English abolitionist Thomas Clarkson, studying at Cambridge, and in the course of writing an essay in Latin (Anne liceat invitos in servitutem dare (Is it lawful to enslave the unconsenting?), read the works of Benezet, and began a lifelong effort to abolish the British slave trade. In 1787, British abolitionists formed the Committee for the Abolition of the Slave Trade, a small nondenominational group that could lobby more successfully by incorporating Anglicans, who, unlike the Quakers, could lawfully sit in Parliament. The twelve founding members included nine Quakers and three pioneering Anglicans: Granville Sharp, Thomas Clarkson, and William Wilberforce – all evangelical Christians.

=== Abolitionism ===
Later successes in opposing racism were won by the abolitionist movement in England and in the United States. Though many Abolitionists did not regard blacks or mulattos as equal to whites, they did, in general, believe in freedom and often even equality of treatment for all people. A few, like John Brown, went further. Brown was willing to die on behalf of, as he said, "millions in this slave country whose rights are disregarded by wicked, cruel, and unjust enactments ..." Many black Abolitionists, such as Frederick Douglass, explicitly argued for the humanity of blacks and mulattoes, and the equality of all people.

Due to resistance in the Southern United States and a general collapse of idealism in the North, Reconstruction ended, giving way to the nadir of American race relations. The period from about 1890 to 1920 saw the re-establishment of Jim Crow laws. President Woodrow Wilson, who regarded Reconstruction as a disaster, segregated the federal government. The Ku Klux Klan grew to its greatest peak of popularity and strength; the success of D. W. Griffith's The Birth of a Nation played a major part in this member increase.

In 1911 the First Universal Races Congress met in London, at which distinguished speakers from many countries for four days discussed race problems and ways to improve interracial relations.

=== Socialism ===
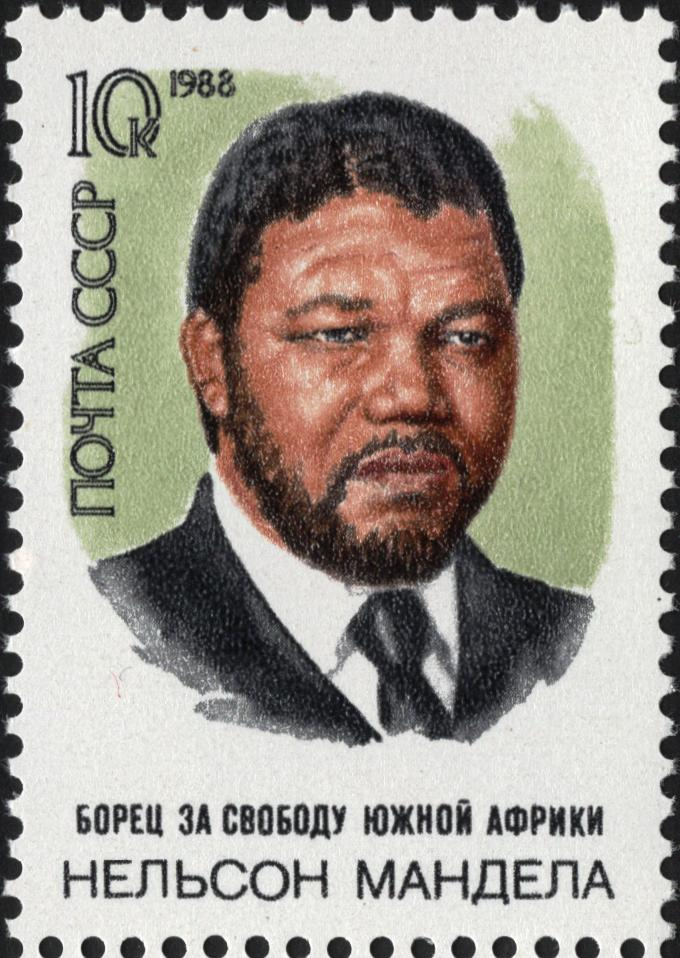
1988 Soviet commemorative stamp, captioned "Fighter for the freedom of South Africa Nelson Mandela" in Russian

Karl Marx was supportive of the Union during the American Civil War and advocated more radical abolitionist measures with his Address of the International Working Men's Association to Abraham Lincoln in 1864. Lincoln would in return commend the International Working Men's Association for their support and declared that the defeat of the South would be a victory for all of humanity.

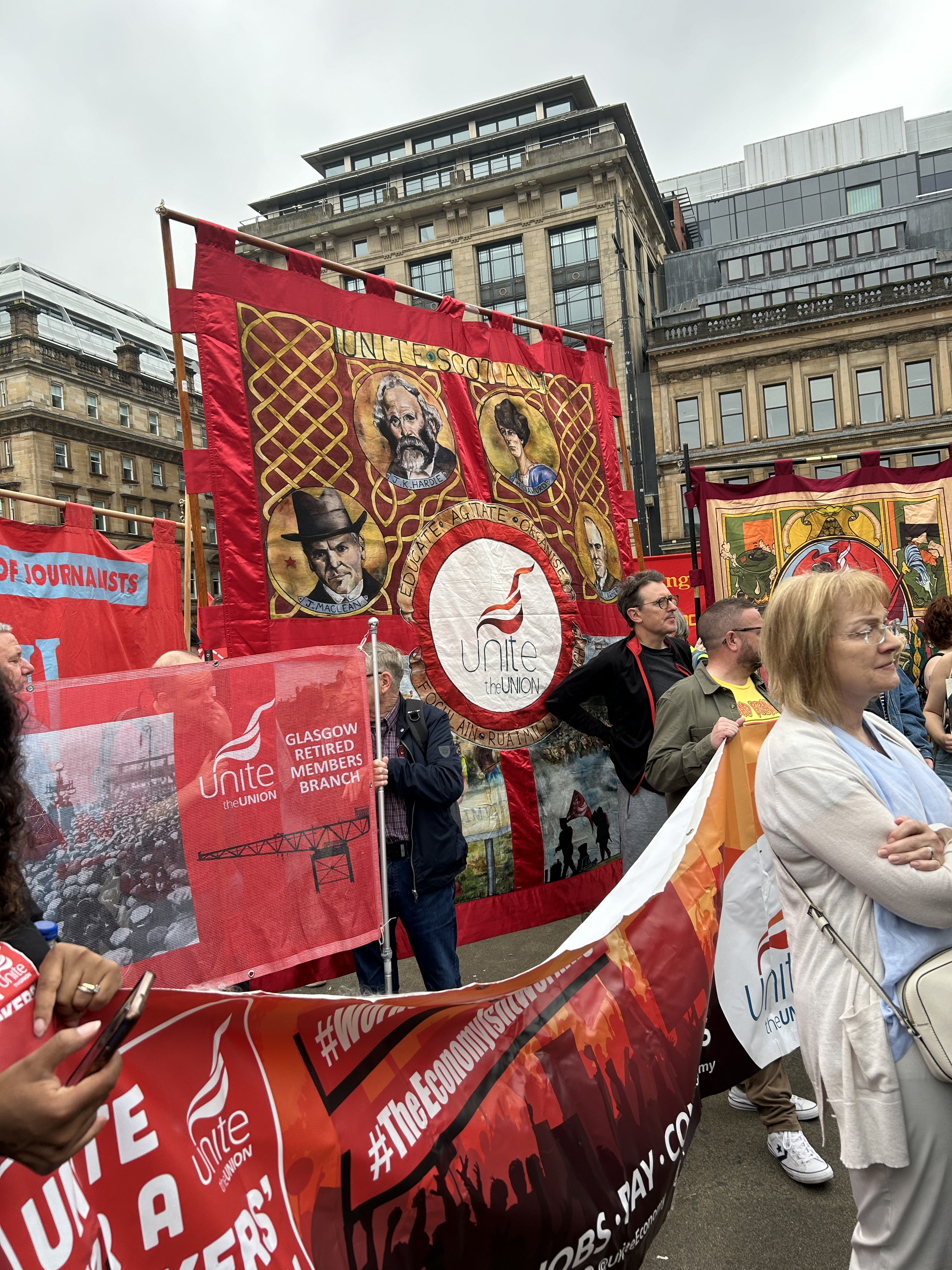
Unite the Union trade unionists at Stand Up to Racism Rally in Glasgow

Marxist theorist Leon Trotsky had advocated for national self-determination for the black population in South Africa. In response to the programmatic document of the South African Left Opposition, he wrote in 1935:

"We must accept decisively and without any reservation the complete and unconditional right of the blacks to independence. Only on the basis of a mutual struggle against the domination of the white exploiters can the solidarity of black and white toilers be cultivated and strengthened".

Through the 1930s, the first viable black trade unions in Transvaal, South Africa were established by Trotskyists.

Modern left-wing commentators have argued that capitalism promotes racism alongside culture wars over issues such as immigration and representation of ethnic minorities whilst refusing to address economic inequalities.

Socialist groups have also been closely aligned with a number of anti-racist organizations such as Love Music Hate Racism, Stand Up to Racism, Anti-Nazi League and Unite Against Fascism.

A number of socialist activists and organisations have linked reparations for slavery and colonisation with a wider set of anti-capitalist demands to reconfigure the world economy. In this view, a transition to a world socialist economy would redress reparations and upskill the quality of education, healthcare and living standards of marginalised communities and working classes.

=== Science ===
Friedrich Tiedemann was one of the first people to scientifically contest racism. In 1836, using craniometric and brain measurements (taken by him from Europeans and black people from different parts of the world), he refuted the belief of many contemporary naturalists and anatomists that black people have smaller brains and are thus intellectually inferior to white people, saying it was scientifically unfounded and based merely on the prejudiced opinions of travelers and explorers. The evolutionary biologist Charles Darwin wrote in 1871 that ‘[i]t may be doubted whether any character can be named which is distinctive of a race and is constant’ and that ‘[a]lthough the existing races of man differ in many respects, as in colour, hair, shape of skull, proportions of the body, &c., yet if their whole structure be taken into consideration they are found to resemble each other closely in a multitude of points.’

German ethnographer Adolf Bastian promoted the idea known as "psychic unity of mankind", the belief in a universal mental framework present in all humans regardless of race. Rudolf Virchow, an early biological anthropologist criticized Ernst Haeckel's classification of humanity into "higher and lower races". The two authors influenced American anthropologist Franz Boas who promoted the idea that differences in behavior between human populations are purely cultural rather than determined by biological differences. Later anthropologists like Ashley Montague, Ruth Benedict, Marcel Mauss, Bronisław Malinowski, Pierre Clastres, and Claude Lévi-Strauss continued to focus on culture and reject racial models of differences in human behavior.

The Jena Declaration, published in 2019 by the German Zoological Society, rejects the idea of human "races" and distances itself from the racial theories of Ernst Haeckel and other 20th century scientists. It claims that genetic variation between human populations is smaller than within them, demonstrating that the biological concept of "races" is invalid. The statement highlights that there are no specific genes or genetic markers that match with conventional racial categorizations. It also indicates that the idea of "races" is based on racism rather than any scientific factuality.

=== Interwar period: Racial Equality Proposal ===
After the end of seclusion in the 1850s, Japan signed unequal treaties, the so-called Ansei Treaties, but soon came to demand equal status with the Western powers. Correcting that inequality became the most urgent international issue of the Meiji government. In that context, the Japanese delegation to the 1919 Paris Peace Conference proposed the clause in the Covenant of the League of Nations. The first draft was presented to the League of Nations Commission by Makino Nobuaki on 13 February as an amendment to Article 21:

The equality of nations being a basic principle of the League of Nations, the High Contracting Parties agree to accord, as soon as possible, to all alien nationals of States Members of the League equal and just treatment in every respect, making no distinction, either in law or in fact, on account of their race or nationality.

After Makino's speech, Lord Cecil stated that the Japanese proposal was a very controversial one and he suggested that perhaps the matter was so controversial that it should not be discussed at all. Greek Prime Minister Eleftherios Venizelos also suggested that a clause banning religious discrimination should also be removed since that was also a very controversial matter. That led to objections from a Portuguese diplomat, who stated that his country had never signed a treaty before that did not mention God, which caused Cecil to remark perhaps this time, they would all just have to a take a chance of avoiding the wrath of the Almighty by not mentioning Him.

Although the proposal received a majority (11 out of 16) of votes, the proposal was still problematic for the segregationist US President Woodrow Wilson, who needed the votes of segregationist Southern Democrats to succeed in getting the votes needed for the US Senate to ratify the treaty. Strong opposition from the British Empire delegation gave him a pretext to reject the proposal. Hughes

=== Mid-century American revival ===
Opposition to racism revived in the 1920s and 1930s. At that time, anthropologists such as Franz Boas, Ruth Benedict, Margaret Mead, and Ashley Montagu argued for the equality of humans across races and cultures. Eleanor Roosevelt was a very visible advocate for minority rights during this period. Anti-capitalist organizations like the Industrial Workers of the World, which gained popularity during 1905–1926, were explicitly egalitarian.

In the 1940s Springfield, Massachusetts, invoked The Springfield Plan to include all persons in the community.

Beginning with the Harlem Renaissance and continuing into the 1960s, many African-American writers argued forcefully against racism.

=== 1960s expansion ===
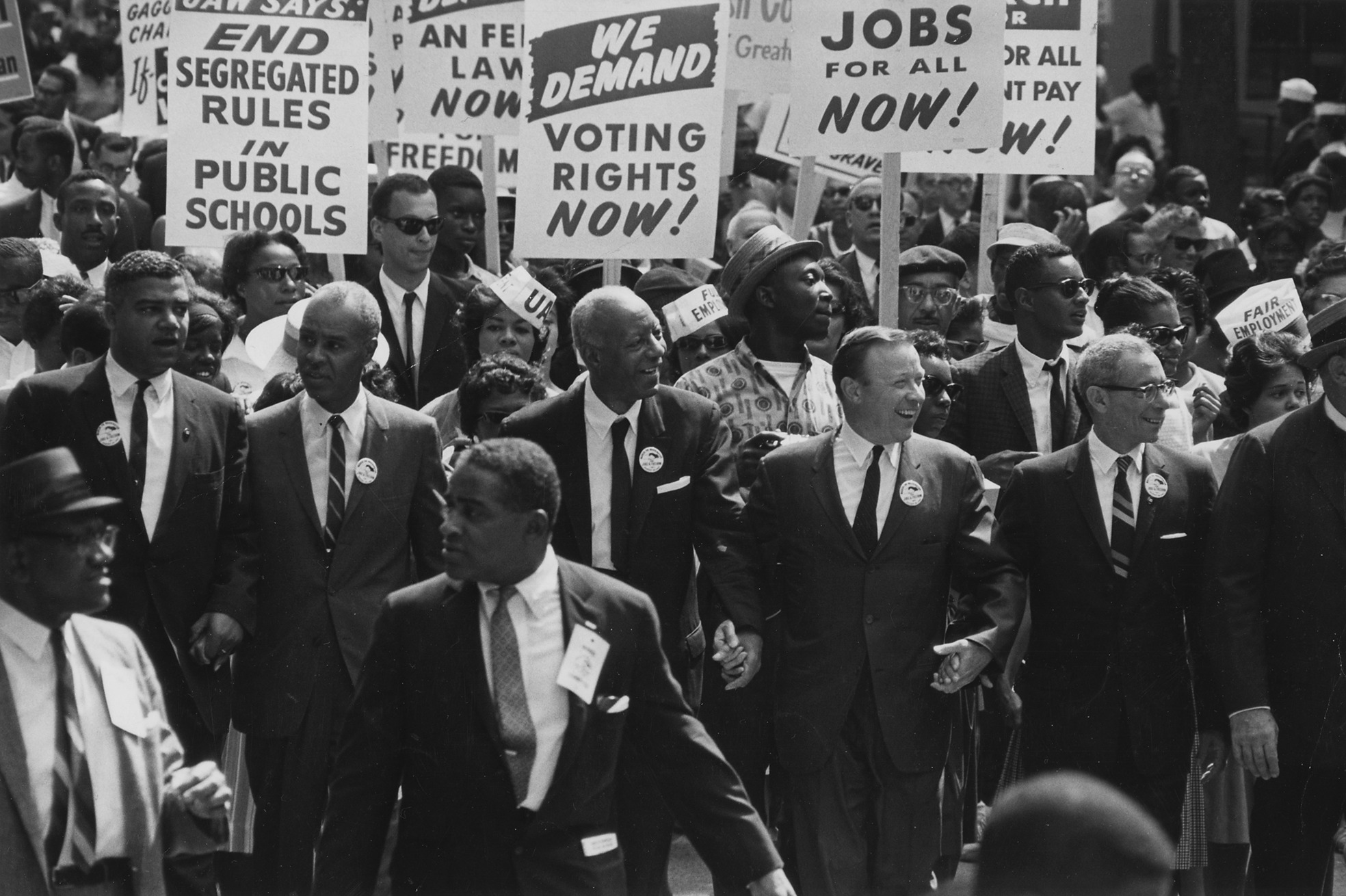
The 1963 March on Washington participants and leaders marching from the Washington Monument to the Lincoln Memorial

The struggles against racial segregation in the United States, South African apartheid, and antisemitism in France saw increased articulation of ideas opposed to racism of all kinds.

During the Civil Rights Movement, Jim Crow laws were repealed in the South and blacks finally re-won the right to vote in Southern states. Dr. Martin Luther King Jr. was an influential force, and his "I Have a Dream" speech is a condensation of his egalitarian ideology.

=== 21st century ===
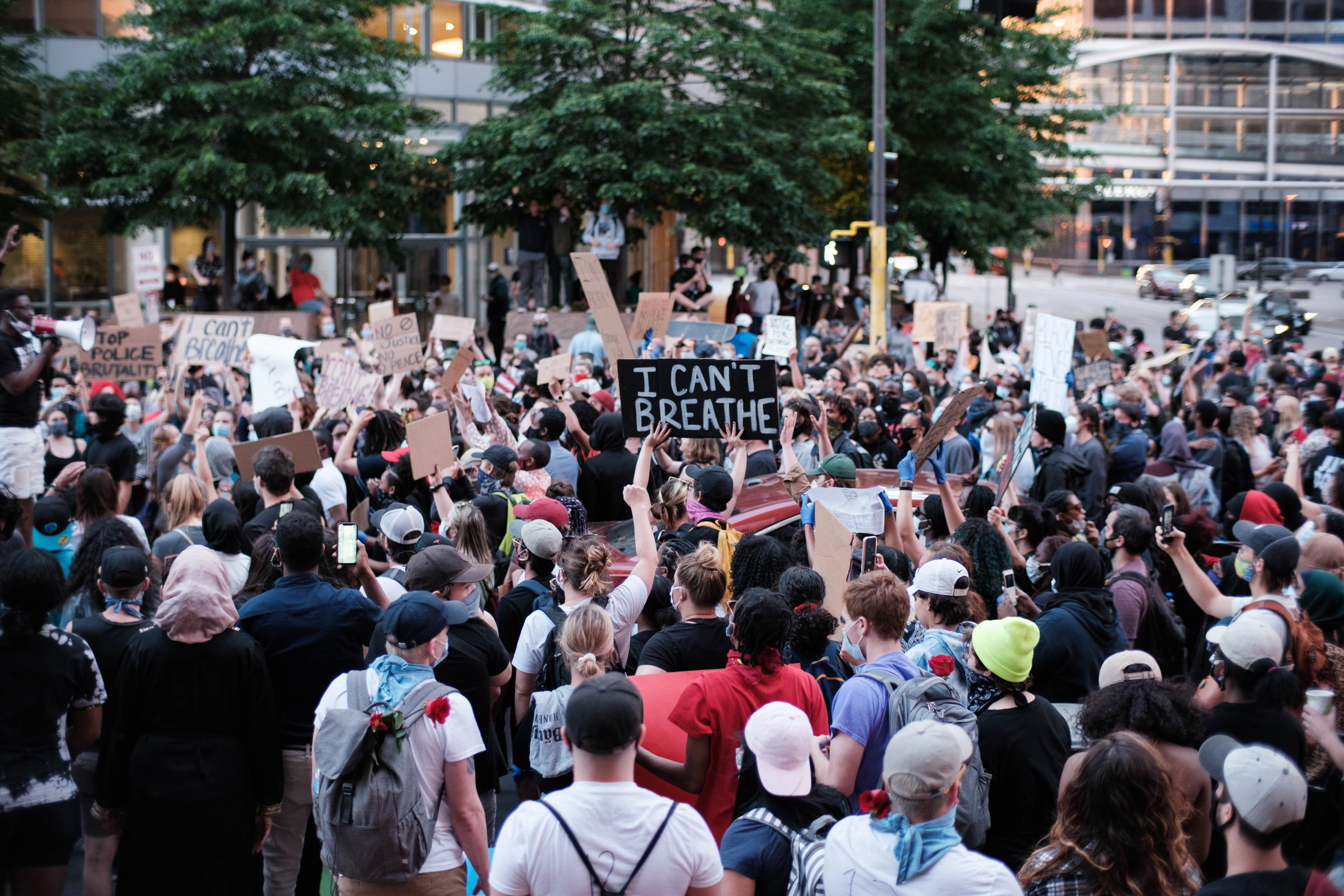
Anti-racism demonstrators at a 2020 George Floyd protest in Minneapolis, Minnesota, United States

Mass mobilization around the Black Lives Matter movement have sparked a renewed interest in anti-racism in the U.S. Mass movement organizing has also been accompanied by academic efforts to foreground research regarding anti-racism in politics, criminal justice reform, inclusion in higher education, and workplace anti-racism. Anti-racism has been argued to include opposition to antisemitism and anti-White racism.

== Strategies ==
Anti-racism has taken various forms such as consciousness-raising activities aimed at educating people about the ways they may perpetuate racism, enhancing cross-cultural understanding between racial groups, countering "everyday" racism in institutional settings, and combating extremist right-wing neo-Nazi and neo-Fascist groups. Anti-essentialist anti-racist approaches avoid essentialising race.

Anti-racists focused on institutional and structural racism have fought, including through nonviolent resistance and legislative campaigns, for anti-discrimination legislation, as exemplified by the US Civil Rights Act, 1964 and UK Race Relations Act 1965. The anti-apartheid movement in the 1980s campaigned globally for an end to racial discrimination in South Africa.

Groups targeted by racism have built political but also cultural movements to demand respect and recognition and revalorise oppressed peoples. Examples include Cultural Zionism, the Harlem Renaissance, negritude, the Black Arts Movement, and the Black pride/Black power and Chicano power movements.

=== Micro-intervention strategies ===
Proponents of anti-racism claim that microaggressions can lead to many negative consequences in a work environment, learning environment, and to their overall sense of self-worth. Anti-racism work aims to combat microaggressions and help to break systemic racism by focusing on actions against discrimination and oppression. Standing up against discrimination can be an overwhelming task for people of color who have been previously targeted. Anti-racists claim that microinterventions can be a tool used to act against racial discrimination.

Microintervention strategies aim to provide the tools needed to confront and educate racial oppressors. Specific tactics include: revealing the hidden biases or agendas behind acts of discrimination, interrupting and challenging oppressive language, educating offenders, and connecting with other allies and community members to act against discrimination. The theory is that these microinterventions allow the oppressor to see the impact of their words, and provide a space for an educational dialogue about how their actions can oppress people marginalized groups.

Microaggressions can be conscious acts where the perpetrator is aware of the offense they are causing, or hidden and metacommunicated without the perpetrator's awareness. Regardless of whether microaggressions are conscious or unconscious behaviors, the first anti-racist intervention is to name the ways it is harmful for a person of color. Calling out an act of discrimination can be empowering because it provides language for people of color to bring awareness to their lived experiences and justifies internal feelings of discrimination.

Anti-racist strategies also include confronting the racial microaggression by outwardly challenging and disagreeing against the microaggression that harms a person of color. Microinterventions such as a verbal expression of "I don't want to hear that talk" and physical movements of disapproval are ways to confront microaggressions. Microinterventions are not used to attack others about their biases, but instead they are used to allow the space for an educational dialogue. Educating a perpetrator on their biases can open up a discussion about how the intention of a comment or action can have a damaging impact. For example, phrases such as "I know you meant that joke to be funny, but that stereotype really hurt me" can educate a person on the difference between what was intended and how it is harmful to a person of color. Anti-racist micro intervention strategies give the tools for people of color, white allies, and bystanders to combat against microaggressions and acts of discrimination.

Another strategy involves fostering an inclusive environment by consistently promoting cultural safety, cultural humility, and narrative humility. Cultural safety encourages individuals to examine their own identities and attitudes, creating spaces that are emotionally, socially, and physically safe for everyone while affirming the unique identities and needs of individuals from diverse cultural backgrounds. Cultural humility complements this by emphasizing self-reflection, co-learning, and collaboration with community members, underscoring the value of shared growth. Narrative humility further enhances this approach by encouraging individuals to listen attentively to others' stories, reflect on their roles within those narratives, and remain open to perspectives that challenge their own. Together, these approaches work to dismantle systemic inequities and cultivate environments grounded in respect, shared understanding, and active participation.

== Influence ==
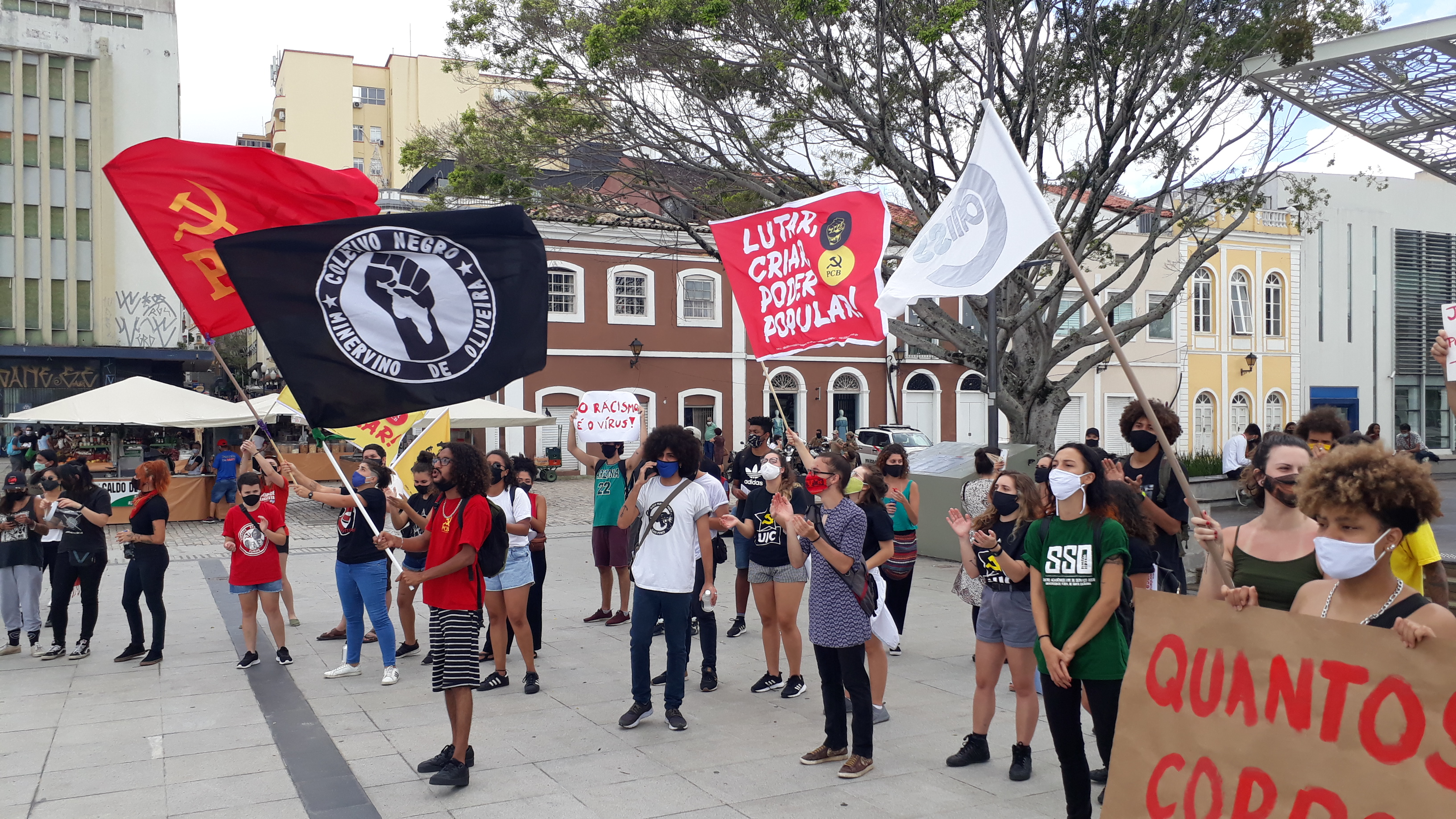
Since the 1960s, November 20th has been celebrated in Brazil as Black Awareness Day.

Egalitarianism has been a catalyst for feminist, anti-war, and anti-imperialist movements. Henry David Thoreau's opposition to the Mexican–American War, for example, was based in part on his fear that the U.S. was using the war as an excuse to expand slavery into new territories. Thoreau's response was chronicled in his famous essay "Civil Disobedience", which in turn helped ignite Mahatma Gandhi's successful leadership of the Indian independence movement. Gandhi's example in turn inspired the American civil rights movement. As James Loewen writes in Lies My Teacher Told Me: "Throughout the world, from Africa to Northern Ireland, movements of oppressed people continue to use tactics and words borrowed from our abolitionist and civil rights movements."

== Criticism ==
Some of these uses have been controversial. Critics in the United Kingdom, such as Peter Hain, stated that in Zimbabwe, Robert Mugabe had used anti-racist rhetoric to promote land distribution, whereby privately held land was taken from white farmers and distributed to black Africans (see: Land reform in Zimbabwe). Roman Catholic bishops stated that Mugabe framed the land distribution as a way to liberate Zimbabwe from colonialism, but that "the white settlers who once exploited what was Rhodesia have been supplanted by a black elite that is just as abusive."

Cultural critic Fredrik deBoer placed blame on "idea-generating" individuals and institutions for the perceived failures of BLM as a social movement.

The phrase "Anti-racist is a code word for anti-white", coined by white nationalist Robert Whitaker, is commonly associated with the topic of white genocide, a white nationalist conspiracy theory which states that mass immigration, integration, miscegenation, low fertility rates and abortion are being promoted in predominantly white countries in order to deliberately turn them minority-white and hence cause white people to become extinct through forced assimilation. The phrase was spotted on billboards near Birmingham, Alabama in 2014, and it was also spotted on billboards in Harrison, Arkansas in 2013.

== Organizations and institutions ==
=== Global ===
- International Day for the Elimination of Racial Discrimination
- UN Human Rights Council Special Rapporteur on contemporary forms of racism, racial discrimination, xenophobia and related forms of intolerance
- World Conference against Racism

=== European ===
- Aktion Courage (Germany)
- Anti-Nazi League (United Kingdom)
- Aktion Kinder des Holocaust (Switzerland)
- Anti-Fascist Action (United Kingdom)
- Black Equity Organisation (United Kingdom)
- Campaign Against Racism and Fascism (United Kingdom)
- Centre for Equal Opportunities and Opposition to Racism (Belgium)
- European Commission against Racism and Intolerance
- Félag Anti-Rasista (Iceland)
- Forever Family (United Kingdom)
- Hepimiz Zokorayız (Turkey)
- Institute of Race Relations (United Kingdom)
- In IUSTITIA (Czech Republic)
- Les Indivisibles (France)
- Love Music Hate Racism (United Kingdom)
- Mouvement contre le racisme et pour l'amitié entre les peuples (France)
- National Assembly Against Racism (United Kingdom)
- "Never Again" Association (Poland)
- Newham Monitoring Project (United Kingdom)
- Racist and Xenophobic Behaviour Monitoring Centre (Poland)
- Residents Against Racism (Ireland)
- Rock Against Racism (United Kingdom)
- Show Racism the Red Card (United Kingdom)
- SOS Racisme (France)
- Stand Up To Racism (United Kingdom)
- Unite Against Fascism (United Kingdom)
- UNITED for Intercultural Action (all of Europe)

=== North American ===
- By Any Means Necessary (BAMN) (United States)
- Anti-Racist Action (North America)
- Black Lives Matter (United States)
- Friends Stand United (United States)
- National Association for the Advancement of Colored People (United States)
- One People's Project (United States)
- Red and Anarchist Skinheads (United States)
- Redneck Revolt (United States)
- Showing Up for Racial Justice (United States)
- Skinheads Against Racial Prejudice (United States)
- Stop AAPI Hate (United States)
- The People's Institute for Survival and Beyond (United States)
- Vera Institute of Justice
- Antifa (United States)

==== Academic ====
- American University - Antiracist Research and Policy Center
- Boston University - Center for Anti-Racist Research, headed by Ibram X. Kendi
- Georgetown University - Racial Justice Institute
- Temple University - Center for Anti-Racism
- Rutgers University - Institute for the Study of Global Racial Justice
- Ohio State University - Kirwan Institute for the Study of Race and Ethnicity
- University of California, Berkeley - Othering & Belonging Institute

=== Pacific ===
- All Together Now (nonprofit group) (Australia)
- Fight Dem Back (Australia and New Zealand)
- People's Front of Anti Racism (Japan)

== See also ==
- Abolitionism
- Abolitionist Teaching
- Affirmative action
- Allophilia
- Anti-antisemitism (countering racism against Jewish people)
- Anti-bias curriculum
- Anti-fascism (countering Fascism)
- Anti-subordination principle
- Approaches to prejudice reduction
- Cancel culture
- Civil rights movements
- Constitutional colorblindness
- Racial color blindness
- Color consciousness
- Critical race theory
- Diversity, equity, and inclusion
- Economic justice
- Environmental justice
- Genocide prevention
- Genocide recognition politics
- Genocide studies
- Hate studies
- History of civil rights in the United States
- Holocaust studies
- Jewish anti-racism
- Index of racism-related articles
- International Convention on the Elimination of All Forms of Racial Discrimination
- Internal resistance to apartheid
- Multiculturalism
- Multiracialism
- Noble savage
- Political correctness
- Race-conscious policy
- Stop Asian Hate
- Strategic essentialism
- Social justice
- Woke
