= Reverse racism =

Concept that affirmative action and similar programs constitute anti-white discrimination

Reverse racism, sometimes referred to as reverse discrimination, is the concept that affirmative action and similar color-conscious programs for redressing racial inequality are forms of anti-white racism. The concept is often associated with conservative social movements, and reflects the belief that social and economic gains by Black people and other people of color cause disadvantages for white people.

Belief in reverse racism is widespread in the United States; however, there is little to no empirical evidence that white Americans are disadvantaged as a group. Racial and ethnic minorities generally lack the ability to damage the interests of whites, who remain the dominant group in the U.S. Claims of reverse racism tend to ignore such disparities in the exercise of power, which most sociologists and psychologists include in their definition of racism.

Allegations of reverse racism by opponents of affirmative action began to emerge in the 1970s, and have formed part of a racial backlash against social gains by people of color. While the U.S. dominates the debate over the issue, the concept of reverse racism has been used internationally to some extent wherever white supremacy has diminished, such as in post-apartheid South Africa.

== United States ==
=== Overview ===
The concept of reverse racism in the United States is commonly associated with conservative opposition to color-conscious policies aimed at addressing racial inequality, such as affirmative action. Amy E. Ansell of Emerson College identifies three main claims about reverse racism: that government programs to redress racial inequality create "invisible victims" in white men; that racial preferences violate the individual right of equal protection before the law; and that color consciousness itself prevents moving beyond the legacy of racism. The concept of reverse racism has also been used in relation to various expressions of hostility, prejudice or discrimination toward white people by members of minority groups.

=== History ===
Concerns that the advancement of African Americans might cause harm to white Americans date back as far as the Reconstruction Era in the context of debates over providing reparations for slavery. Claims of reverse racism in the early 21st century tend to rely on individual anecdotes, often based on third- or fourth-hand reports, such as of a white person losing a job to a Black person.

Allegations of reverse racism emerged prominently in the 1970s, building on the racially color-blind view that any preferential treatment linked to membership in a racial group was morally wrong. Sociologist Bob Blauner argues that reverse racism had become the primary meaning of racism among whites by the late 1970s, suggesting that conservatives and centrist liberals in the U.S. had effectively "won the battle over the meaning of racism". Where past race-conscious policies such as Jim Crow have been used to maintain white supremacy, modern programs such as affirmative action aim to reduce racial inequality. Despite affirmative-action programs' successes in doing so, conservative opponents claimed that such programs constituted a form of anti-white racism. For example, sociologist Nathan Glazer argued in his 1975 book Affirmative Discrimination that affirmative action was a form of reverse racism violating white people's right to equal protection under the law. This view was boosted by the Supreme Court's decision in Regents of the University of California v. Bakke (1978), which said that racial quotas for minority students were discriminatory against white people.

Legal cases concerning so-called "reverse racism" date back as far as the 1970s, for instance Regents of the University of California v. Bakke; Gratz v. Bollinger; and Grutter v. Bollinger (regarding discrimination in higher education admissions) and Ricci v. DeStefano (regarding employment discrimination). Such cases are rare; out of almost half a million complaints filed with the Equal Employment Opportunity Commission (EEOC) between 1987 and 1994, four percent were about reverse discrimination. Sociologist Eduardo Bonilla-Silva writes that the actual number of reverse discrimination cases filed with the EEOC is quite small, and the vast majority are dismissed as unfounded. Between 1990 and 1994, courts in the U.S. rejected all reverse discrimination cases as without merit.

Since 2020, conservative activists such as Stephen Miller and Edward Blum have challenged diversity, equity, and inclusion (DEI) programs as being discriminatory towards whites. Following the 2023 Supreme Court ruling against race-conscious affirmative action in college admissions, US courts have seen an increase in reverse discrimination claims, with some individual plaintiffs being awarded damages against companies such as Starbucks and Novant Health.

=== Public attitudes ===
While not empirically supported, belief in reverse racism is widespread in the United States, primarily among white people. Psychological studies with white Americans have shown that belief in anti-white discrimination is linked with support for the existing racial hierarchy in the U.S. as well as the belief that "hard work" and meritocracy explain any racial disparities. The idea that whites have become a socially disadvantaged group has contributed to the rise of conservative social movements such as the Tea Party and support for Donald Trump. Conservatives in the U.S. tend to believe that affirmative action based on membership in a designated racial group threatens the American system of individualism and meritocracy. Ansell associates the idea of reverse racism with that of the "angry white male" and a backlash against government actions meant to remedy racial discrimination.

The perception of decreasing anti-Black discrimination has been correlated with white people's belief in rising anti-white discrimination. A survey in Pennsylvania in the mid-1990s found that most white respondents (80%) thought it was likely that a white worker might lose a job or a promotion to a less qualified Black worker, while most Black respondents (57%) thought this was unlikely. A majority (57%) of white respondents to a 2016 survey by the Public Religion Research Institute said they believed discrimination against white people was as significant a problem as discrimination against Black people, while only a minority of African Americans (29%) and Hispanics (38%) agreed. Researchers at Tufts University and Harvard report that as of the early 2010s many white Americans feel as though they suffer the greatest discrimination among racial groups, despite data to the contrary. Whereas Black respondents see anti-Black racism as a continuing problem, white ones tend to think it has largely disappeared, to the point that they see prejudice against white people as being more prevalent. Among white respondents since the 1990s:

Whites have replaced Blacks as the primary victims of discrimination. This emerging perspective is particularly notable because by nearly any metric [...] statistics continue to indicate drastically poorer outcomes for Black than White Americans.

Bonilla-Silva describes the "anti–affirmative action and 'reverse racism' mentality" that has become dominant since the 1980s as part of a "mean-spirited white racial animus". He argues that this results from a new dominant ideology of "color-blind racism", which treats racial inequality as a thing of the past, thereby allowing it to continue by opposing concrete efforts at reform. Journalist Vann R. Newkirk II writes that white people's belief in reverse racism has steadily increased since the civil rights movement of the 1960s. Using data from the 2006 Portraits of American Life Study, Damon Mayrl and Aliya Saperstein find that whites who claim to have experienced racial discrimination are "more likely to be racially self-aware, to be pessimistic about the future, and to have a recent history of unemployment compared to their non-discrimination-reporting peers".

=== Scholarly analysis ===
While there has been little empirical study on the subject of reverse racism, the few existing studies have found little evidence that white males, in particular, are victimized by affirmative-action programs. Race relations in the United States have been historically shaped by European imperialism and long-standing oppression of Blacks by whites, who remain the dominant group. Such disparities in power and authority are seen by scholars as an essential component of racism; in this view, isolated examples of favoring disadvantaged people do not constitute racism. In a widely reprinted article, legal scholar Stanley Fish wrote that "'Reverse racism' is a cogent description of affirmative action only if one considers the cancer of racism to be morally and medically indistinguishable from the therapy we apply to it".

Sociologist Ellis Cashmore writes that the terms reverse racism and reverse discrimination imply that racism is defined solely by individual beliefs and prejudices, ignoring the material relations between different groups. Sociologist Joe Feagin argues that the term reverse discrimination is an oxymoron in the context of U.S. race relations in that it obscures the "central issue of systemic racism" disadvantaging people of color. Critical race theorist David Theo Goldberg says the notion of reverse racism represents a denial of the historical and contemporary reality of racial discrimination. Sociologist Karyn McKinney writes, "most claims that whites are victimized as whites rely on false parallels, as they ignore the power differences between whites and people of color at the group level". Anthropologist Jane H. Hill argues that charges of reverse racism tend to deny the existence of white privilege and power in society. Linguist Mary Bucholtz says the concept of reverse racism, which she calls racial reversal, "runs counter to or ignores empirically observable racial asymmetries regarding material resources and structural power".

According to sociologist Rutledge Dennis, individual members of minority groups in the United States "may be racists" toward white people, but cannot wield institutional power or shape the opportunities available to the majority as the white majority does in relation to minorities. Sociologists Matthew Desmond and Mustafa Emirbayer distinguish between institutional racism and interpersonal racism, arguing that while "members of all racial groups can harbor negative attitudes toward members of other groups", there is no "black institutional racism" or "reverse institutional racism" since people of color have not created a socially ingrained system of racial domination over white people. Psychologist and educator Beverly Daniel Tatum argues that racial bigotry or prejudices held by people of color are not comparable to white racism since "there is no systematic cultural and institutional support or sanction" for them. Tatum writes, "In my view, reserving the term racist only for behaviors committed by Whites in the context of a White-dominated society is a way of acknowledging the ever-present power differential afforded Whites by the culture and institutions that make up the system of advantage and continue to reinforce notions of White superiority."

Promotion of substantive equality, for example through affirmative action, may violate formal equality of opportunity according to Richard Arneson. Differences between equality concepts are also called Dilemma of difference.

== South Africa ==
The concept of reverse racism has been used by some white South Africans concerned about "reverse apartheid" following the end of white-supremacist rule. Affirmative action in South Africa's white-dominated civil service was also met with charges of "reverse racism".

Nelson Mandela in 1995 described "racism in reverse" when Black students demonstrated in favor of changing the racial makeup of staff at South African universities. Students denied Mandela's claim and argued that a great deal of ongoing actual racism persisted from apartheid.

Mixed-race South Africans have also sometimes claimed to be victimized by reverse racism of the new government. Similar accusations have been leveled by Indian and Afrikaner groups, who feel that they have not been dominant historically but now suffer from discrimination by the government.

Helen Suzman, a prominent white anti-apartheid politician, charged the African National Congress and the Mbeki administration with reverse racism since Mandela's departure in 1999.

South African critics of the "reverse racism" concept use similar arguments as those employed by Americans.

== See also ==
- Racism in South Africa
- Racism in the United States
- Racism in France
- Minoritarianism
- Reverse sexism – Sociological concept
- Xenoracism – Form of prejudice
