= White backlash =

Political theory

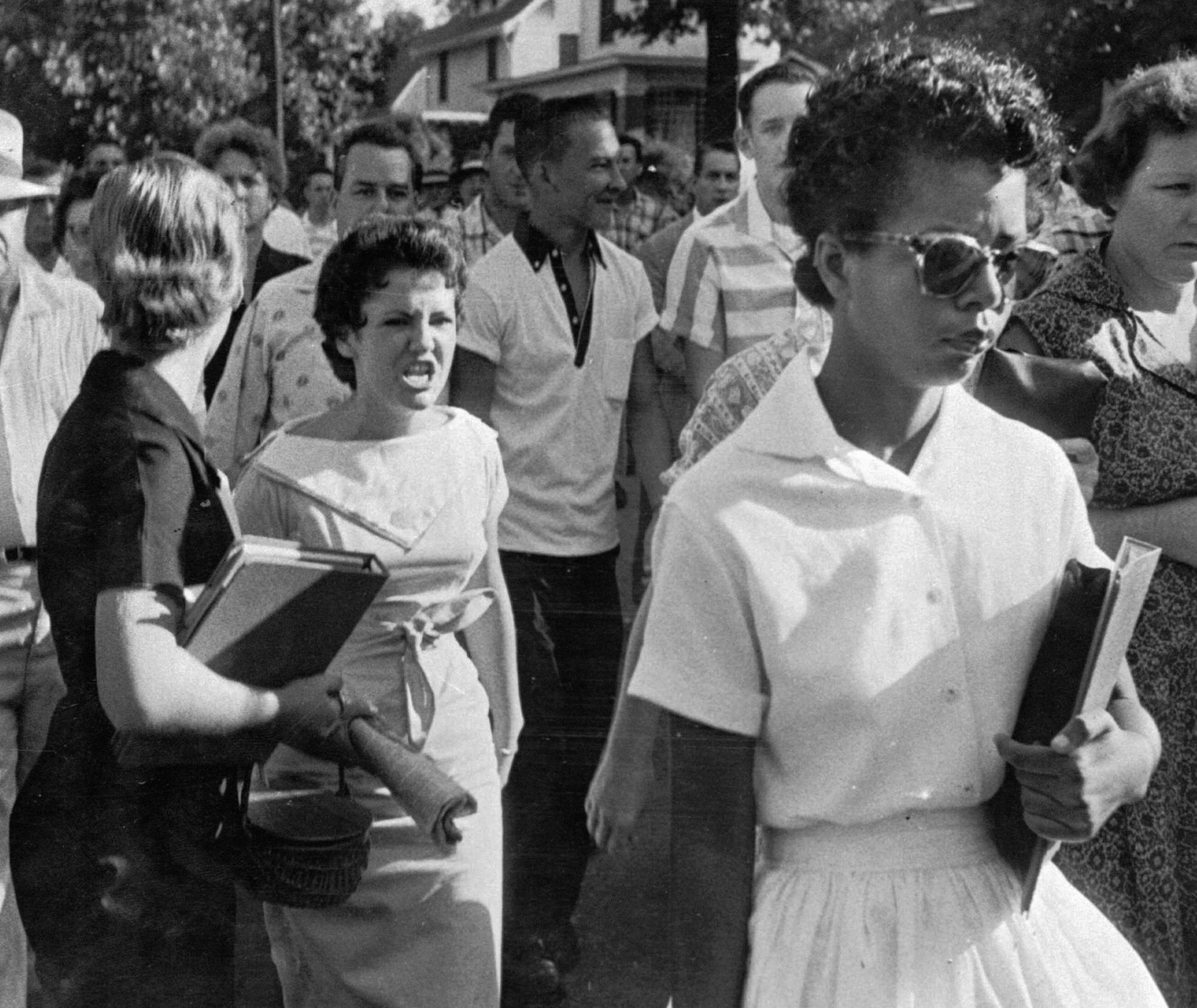
Elizabeth Eckford being heckled by white student Hazel Bryan outside Little Rock Central High School, 4 September, 1957. White opposition to school integration following Brown v. Board of Education (1954) is an example of such backlash.

White backlash, white rage, whitelash, and white grievance are terms used by some scholars and commentators to describe reactions by certain white individuals or groups to social, economic, or political changes related to race. It is often discussed in connection with perceptions of declining relative status, changes in cultural influence, or shifts in political power following efforts to expand civil rights and economic opportunities for other racial or ethnic groups.

George Yancy, Robin DiAngelo and other writers have used the term to characterize strong negative reactions to discussions of racial inequality or the concept of white privilege. In this framing, such reactions may include hostility, resistance to critique, or, in more extreme cases, racist rhetoric or threats of violence. These interpretations are sometimes contrasted with concepts such as white fragility, which focuses more narrowly on defensive responses rather than overt hostility.

Discussions of white backlash most commonly focus on the United States, particularly in relation to the social, economic and political status of African Americans. However, similar dynamics have also been examined in other national contexts, including the United Kingdom and South Africa, especially in analyses of racial politics during and after apartheid, the system of legally enforced racial segregation and discrimination against black South Africans by the minority Afrikaner herrenvolk government.

== Sociology ==
Concerns among some whites about immigration and demographic change have been identified by researchers as factors associated with political and social opposition to these trends. Political scientist Ashley E. Jardina spoke about how perceptions of shifting social structures influence attitudes, noting that some white Americans perceive changes in the country's demographic composition as altering long-standing cultural and political arrangements, including the historical prominence of white Anglo-Saxon Protestant (WASP) norms.

A 2018 study conducted at the University of California, Riverside found that awareness of the growth of Hispanic and Latino populations can lead some non-Hispanic white Americans to perceive existing racial hierarchies as being challenged, which may affect political attitudes and behavior. Similarly, research published in the European Journal of Social Psychology reported that informing white British participants about rising immigration levels increased their likelihood of supporting political candidates with restrictive immigration policies.

Commentator Kevin Drum has observed that as the proportion of residents in the United States who are not non-Hispanic white increased from 25 percent in 1990 to 40 percent in 2019, this demographic change may have produced a "short-term white backlash in recent years.".

Historian Lawrence Glickman, writing in The Atlantic in 2020, situates such political responses within a broader historical context. He argues that political reactions labeled as "backlashes" became more prominent in the 1960s but reflect earlier patterns in American political history, including those following Reconstruction. Glickman suggests that these responses often emerge in anticipation of social change and that narratives emphasizing perceived disadvantage have played a role in shaping various political movements over time.

== Regions ==
=== United States ===
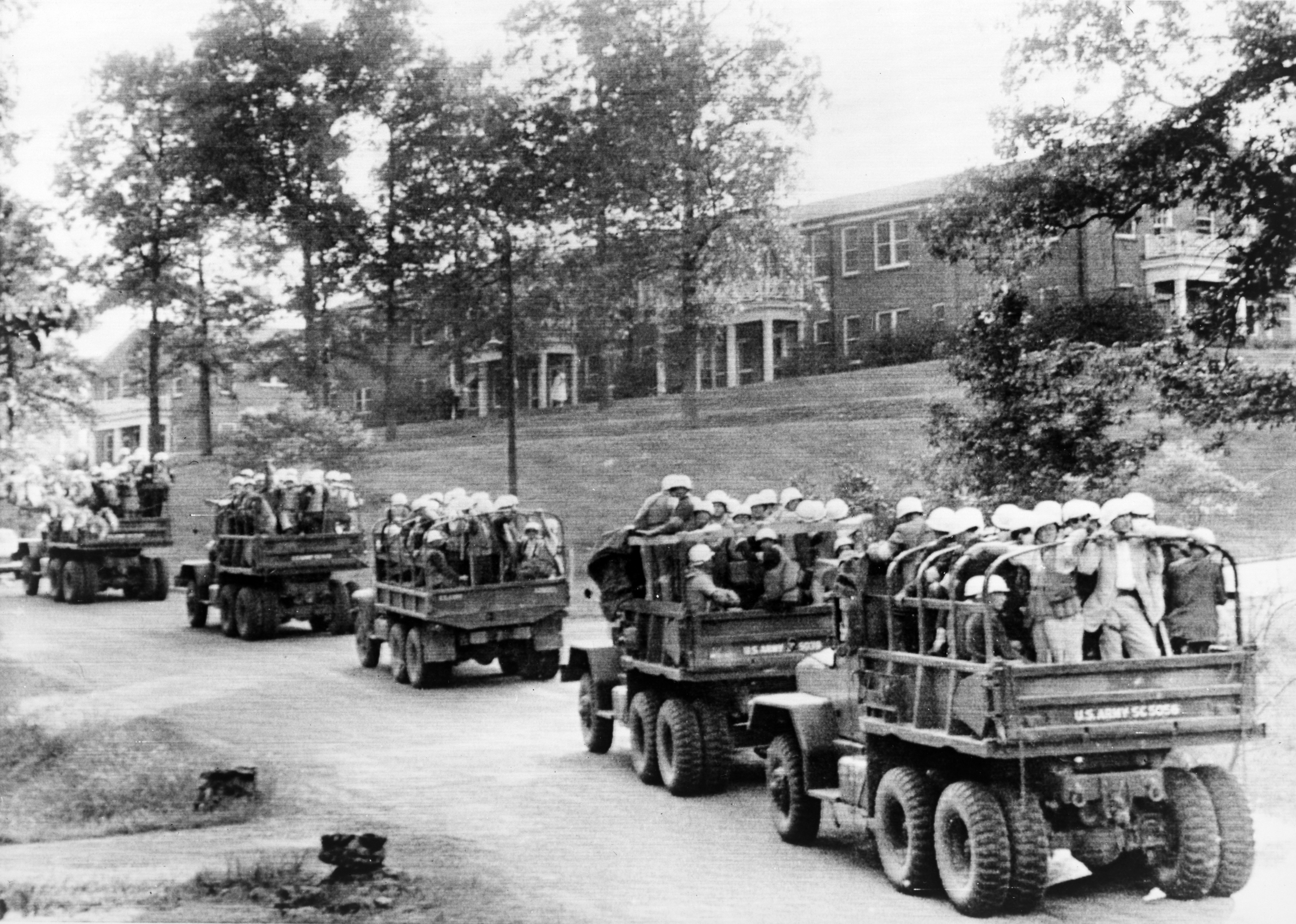
White outrage over the enrollment of black student James Meredith at the University of Mississippi in Oxford led to a riot in September 1962. In an effort to quell the white mob, Attorney General Robert F. Kennedy mobilized the U.S. Marshals Service to protect Meredith and restore order. Pictured are U.S. Marshals being transported in U.S. Army trucks on the Ole Miss campus, 3 October 1962.

One early example of this concept occurred when Hiram R. Revels became the first African-American to serve in the United States Senate in 1870 after he was selected by a vote of 81 to 15 in the Mississippi legislature to finish the term of one of the state's two seats in the US Senate, which had been left vacant since the American Civil War. This was before the ratification of the 17th Amendment to the constitution of the United States in 1913, which introduced direct elections for the office of senator. The backlash to this event ultimately helped to derail Reconstruction, which ended after the contested presidential election in 1876. The Compromise of 1877 led to the withdrawal of federal troops from the American South, effectively leaving the region to the hands of Jim Crow racial segregation policies and the effective disenfranchisement of black Americans in the region.

Similarly, the 1898 massacre in Wilmington, North Carolina occurred as a backlash by white Democrats to significant political changes in the city at the time, when the city was governed by a legally elected, biracial coalition supported by blacks and white Republicans. This arrangement was strongly opposed by the white Democratic leadership and their supporters, who viewed the existing government as illegitimate and destabilizing to the political and social order they favored. This ultimately contributed to the backlash that ultimately led to the forced removal of elected officials. The events that followed involved violence, the suppression of black political influence, and the imposition of a new municipal leadership aligned with the insurrection's leaders, contributing to the broader pattern of disfranchisement of black Americans in the South.

Another backlash happened after the passage of the Civil Rights Act of 1964. Many Democrats in Congress, as well as President Lyndon B. Johnson himself, feared that such a backlash could develop in response to the legislation, and Martin Luther King Jr. popularized the "white backlash" phrase and concept to warn of that possibility. The backlash that they had warned about occurred and was based on the argument that whites of immigrant descent did not receive the benefits that were given to African Americans in the Civil Rights Act. After signing the Civil Rights Act, Johnson grew concerned that the white backlash would cost him the 1964 presidential election later that year. Specifically, Johnson feared that his opponent, Barry Goldwater, would harness the backlash by highlighting the black riots that were engulfing the country. Despite the fears, Johnson won the election by a landslide, only losing South Carolina, Georgia, Alabama, Mississippi, Louisiana and Goldwater's home state of Arizona. Eventually, white southerners switched to the Republican Party.

From then on, Republican politicians have been accused of carrying out dog-whistle politics, and examples of this arguments include the phrase "welfare queen" and the Willie Horton ad during the 1988 election.

Following the election of Barack Obama as the first black president of the United States in 2008, some commentators later argued that political and cultural reactions to demographic and social change led to a backlash, and influenced subsequent electoral outcomes such as the 2010 and 2014 midterms.

In this context, many pundits saw the election of Donald Trump as president in 2016 as an example of whitelash. CNN contributor Van Jones coined the term whitelash (a portmanteau of "white" and "backlash") during the 2016 election night coverage by the network to describe what he viewed as a backlash to these changes, including opposition to Obama's presidency. He said: "This was a whitelash. This was a whitelash against a changing country. It was a whitelash against a black president in part. And that's the part where the pain comes." Jones used the term to describe one of the reasons he thought Trump won the election, and he characterized Trump's victory as partly reflecting this reaction, a view that has been discussed but not universally accepted.

During Trump's first presidency he used the example of Luis Bracamontes, a man convicted of killing two police officers in Sacramento in 2014 and sentenced to death, to migrant caravans with the slogans "Democrats let him into our country" and "Democrats let him stay".

After the 2020 election, which was won by Joe Biden, Trump and his allies carried out attempts to overturn his election loss, with many participating in the so-called "Stop the Steal" movement, which culminated in the January 6, 2021, attack on the US Capitol. These events have been interpreted by some scholars and commentators as reflecting broader historical narratives in American politics. Certain analysts have drawn parallels between these events and the Lost Cause myth after the Confederacy lost the American Civil War. Historian Joseph Ellis has argued that overlooking the role of race in Trump's political support echoes earlier historical tendencies to downplay racial factors in major national conflicts, including the disputed argument made by Lost Cause advocates, who attributed the American Civil War to a clash over constitutional issues while downplaying the role of slavery. These interpretations, however, remain subjects of debate among historians and political analysts.

=== South Africa ===
Throughout the latter half of the 20th century, South Africa’s apartheid system faced growing political, social, and moral pressure, both domestically and internationally. The Afrikaner government's actions during this period frequently reflected concern over potential backlash from segments of the white electorate, particularly among Afrikaners, whose political dominance apartheid was designed to protect.

In 1975, reports indicated that the government was slow to approve the desegregation of residential areas due to fears of resistance from conservative Afrikaner communities. This reluctance underscored the extent to which apartheid policies were maintained to preserve racial privilege rather than to promote equality. Similarly, in 1981, The New York Times reported that Prime Minister P. W. Botha's cabinet, wary of a white backlash, publicly emphasized statistics showing disproportionately higher per capita spending on education for white children than for Black children—figures that highlighted the systemic inequalities at the core of apartheid.

During the 1980s, electoral trends reflected growing divisions within the white population. Support for the ruling National Party declined among white Afrikaners, while the Conservative Party gained traction by advocating for even stricter racial separation. At the same time, a significant number of white South Africans - including clergy, journalists, academics, business leaders, and members of liberal political parties - actively opposed apartheid, participated in protests, supported reform, or worked with anti-apartheid movements despite social and legal risks.

As apartheid began to be dismantled, resistance from parts of the white population persisted. In 1990, political commentator Jeane Kirkpatrick observed that President F. W. de Klerk was aware that opinion polls showed substantial white opposition to his reform policies. Nevertheless, de Klerk proceeded with negotiations that led to a 1992 referendum which ultimately led to the end of apartheid. In 1994, South Africa held its first multiracial democratic election, resulting in Nelson Mandela being elected president of South Africa (the first black president in South African history), the African National Congress winning a majority in the South African Parliament, and marking the formal end of institutionalized racial segregation.

In the years following apartheid, concerns about Afrikaner identity and political marginalization continued to surface. By the late 1990s, some Afrikaner groups warned of backlash unless cultural autonomy initiatives, such as the proposed so-called Volkstaat at Orania, were recognized. Former president P. W. Botha also cautioned against threats to the Afrikaans language, framing them as potential sources of unrest. These debates occurred alongside efforts by the post-apartheid government to redress historical injustices and promote inclusion.

More recently, discussions of historical memory and transformation have continued to provoke controversy. In 2017, scholar John Campbell suggested that opposition, particularly among Afrikaners, to the removal of colonial-era statues, the renaming of places, and the increased use of English at historically white universities was, to some extent, predictable. These debates reflect the ongoing challenge of reconciling cultural identity with the legacy of a system widely condemned for its racial oppression and denial of basic human rights.

== See also ==
- Affirmative action bake sale
- Angry white male
- Birtherism
- Culture war
- Dog-whistle politics
- Ethnocultural politics in the United States
- Flaggers (movement)
- Grievance politics
- Karen (slang)
- Obamagate
- Populism in Europe
- Race-baiting
- Race card
- Reverse racism
- Right-wing populism in the United States
- Silent majority
- Sister Souljah moment
- Southern strategy
- Trumpism
  - Racial views of Donald Trump
- Wedge issue
- White defensiveness
- White identity politics
