= Rafał Gaweł =

Polish anti-racism activist

Rafał Gaweł is the founder of the Racist and Xenophobic Behaviour Monitoring Centre (Polish: Ośrodek Monitorowania Zachowań Rasistowskich i Ksenofobicznych OMZRiK), a Polish anti-racism monitoring group. In 2019 he was sentenced to a two-year prison term. Gaweł was awarded temporary political asylum on 30 September 2020 in Norway. The asylum was granted for three reasons: the lack of the possibility of a fair trial, the lack of Polish authorities' control of extreme-right militias, and the criminal case against him appearing to constitute political persecution by Polish authorities. The granting of political asylum to European Union (EU) citizens in EEA member states was rare as of 2020.

== Theatre and OMZRiK ==
Gaweł is known in Białystok, a city in Poland near the border with Belarus, as the director of the ThreeRivers Theatre (Polish: Teatr TrzyRzecze) and as the founder and head of the Centre for Monitoring Racist and Xenophobic Behaviour (Polish: Ośrodek Monitorowania Zachowań Rasistowskich i Ksenofobicznych OMZRiK), a Polish anti-racism monitoring group.

OMZRiK monitored crimes involving racist motives and submitted legal cases against them. In 2017, OMZRiK lodged 45 legal cases of this sort. Gaweł stated that the Prosecutor's office was unhappy to receive the complaints.

One of OMZRiK's cases that achieved major media interest was related to a prosecutor, Dawid Roszkowski, who refused to carry out prosecutions for use of the swastika on the grounds of its use in Hinduism. Roszkowski's superior was fired. Roszkowski was later promoted to head of the South Białystok Prosecutor's Office.

== Other activism ==
Gaweł submitted a legal case, including a "subsidiary indictment" in November 2021, against twelve politicians, including ministers at the time Piotr Gliński and Mariusz Błaszczak, and members of the European Parliament (MEPs) Beata Mazurek, Tomasz Poręba, Beata Kempa, and Patryk Jaki, accusing them of violating Polish hate speech laws in the leadup to the 2018 Polish local elections by disseminating a video encouraging Islamophobia. On 9 November 2023, the European Parliament lifted the parliamentary immunity of the four MEPs, allowing the prosecution to proceed.

== Criminal case ==
In 2017, Gaweł and two colleagues were accused of major financial fraud in relation to ThreeRivers and OMZRiK, with claims that he had defrauded a bank of 200,000zł and the Stefan Batory Foundation of 100,000zł. Gaweł pleaded not guilty. The Stefan Batory Foundation denied the claim that it had been defrauded.

In January 2019, Gaweł was sentenced to two years' prison, after having appealed an initial sentence of four years. According to the court, the lowering of the sentence was related to Gaweł having returned some of the funds that he had been awarded and had allocated for private use.

== Political asylum ==
On 7 January 2019, Gaweł and his family fled for his safety to Norway, without a passport, and with help from "a diplomatic contact". He and his family were awarded political asylum on 30 September 2020 in Norway for three reasons: he had an unfair trial and was unlikely to obtain a fair trial; Polish authorities did not prevent the activities of right-wing militias; and the criminal case against him appeared to be a case of political persecution by Polish authorities. Gaweł's lawyer, Łukasz Niedzielski, described Gaweł's situation as political persecution disguised as a criminal case.

Gaweł's case is a rare case of asylum granted to a European Union (EU) citizen in Norway or in EU member states. One Pole was granted asylum in Norway in 2019, out of 18 EU citizens granted asylum in Norway during 2010–2019.

Gaweł was given an initial refugee status for one year, which is renewable and convertible to permanent residency.

Threats were made against Gaweł in October 2024, initially online. According to Gaweł, a Polish nationalist travelled to Norway, threatening Gaweł. Gaweł stated that Norwegian police warned him of the threat, requested him to move his residence, and provided him with 24-hour protection. The person suspected of threatening Gaweł was detained by Norwegian police, required to report weekly to the police, and returned to Poland.
