= Populism in Europe =

Populism has been a notable feature of European politics for centuries, with several movements across the political spectrum drawing support from the working classes to challenge the power of Established elites.

== 19th and 20th centuries ==
In the Russian Empire during the late 19th century, the narodnichestvo movement emerged, advocating for the peasantry against the ruling elites. The movement was unable to secure its objectives, however it inspired other agrarian movements across eastern Europe in the early 20th century. Although the Russian movement was primarily a movement of the middle class and intellectuals "going to the people", in some respects their agrarian populism was similar to that of the U.S. People's Party, with both presenting small farmers (the peasantry in Europe) as the foundation of society and main source of societal morality. According to Eatwell, the narodniks "are often seen as the first populist movement".

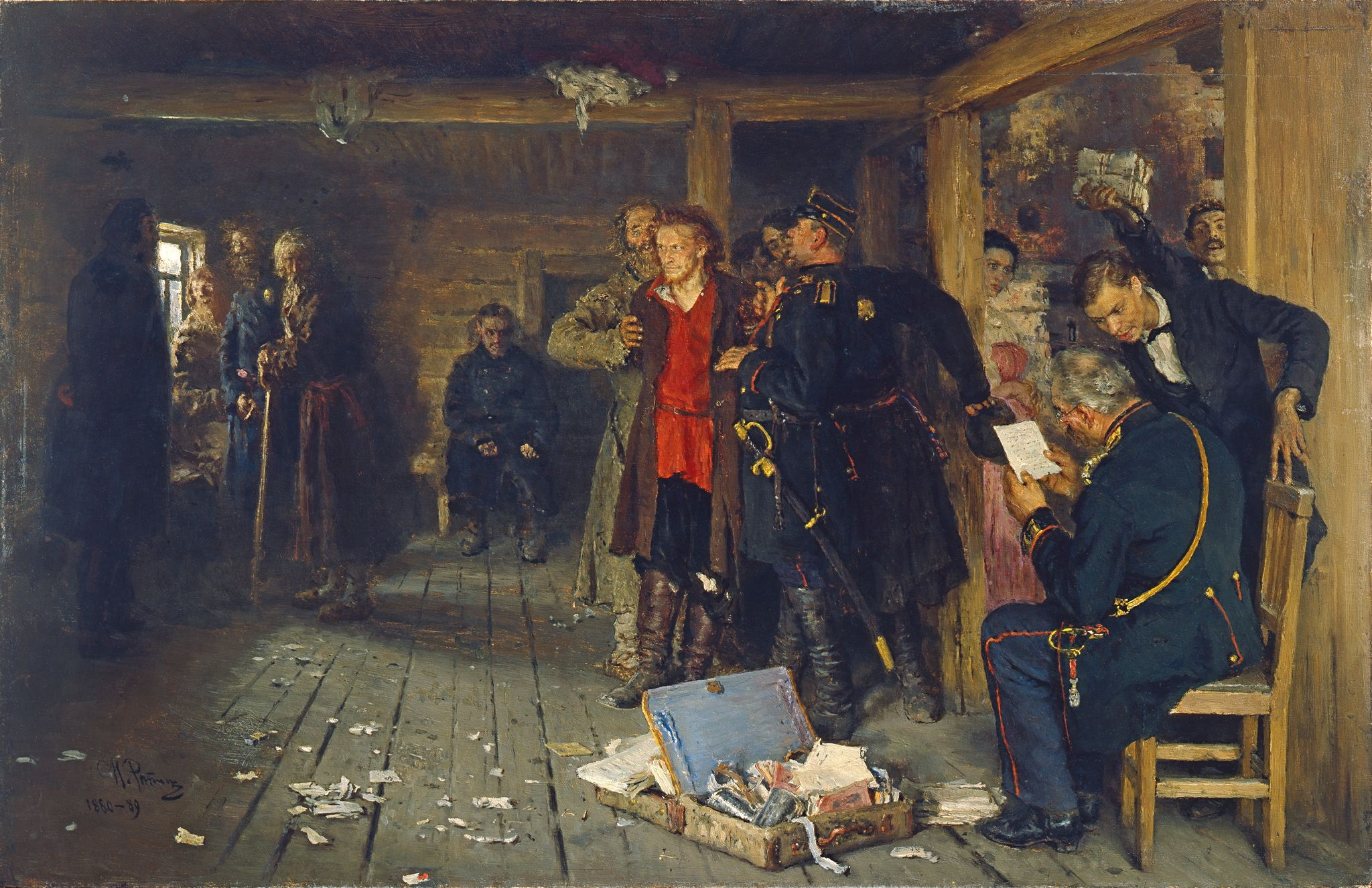
Ilya Repin's painting, Arrest of a Propagandist (1892), which depicts the arrest of a narodnik

In German-speaking Europe, the völkisch movement has often been characterised as populist, with its exultation of the German people and its anti-elitist attacks on capitalism and Jews. In France, the Boulangist movement also utilised populist rhetoric and themes. In the early 20th century, adherents of both Marxism and Fascism flirted with populism, but both movements remained ultimately elitist, emphasising the idea of a small elite who should guide and govern society. Among Marxists, the emphasis on class struggle and the idea that the working classes are affected by false consciousness are also antithetical to populist ideas.

In the years following the Second World War, populism was largely absent from Europe, in part due to the domination of elitist Marxism–Leninism in Eastern Europe and a desire to emphasize moderation among many West European political parties. However, over the coming decades, a number of right-wing populist parties emerged throughout the continent. These were largely isolated and mostly reflected a conservative agricultural backlash against the centralization and politicization of the agricultural sector then occurring. These included Guglielmo Giannini's Common Man's Front in 1940s Italy, Pierre Poujade's Union for the Defense of Tradesmen and Artisans in late 1950s France, Hendrik Koekoek's Farmers' Party of the 1960s Netherlands, and Mogens Glistrup's Progress Party of 1970s Denmark. Between the late 1960s and the early 1980s there also came a concerted populist critique of society from Europe's New Left, including from the new social movements and from the early Green parties. However it was only in the late 1990s, according to Mudde and Rovira Kaltwasser, that populism became "a relevant political force in Europe", one which could have a significant impact on mainstream politics.

Following the fall of the Soviet Union and the Eastern Bloc of the early 1990s, there was a rise in populism across much of Central and Eastern Europe. In the first multiparty elections in many of these countries, various parties portrayed themselves as representatives of "the people" against the "elite", representing the old governing Marxist–Leninist parties. The Czech Civic Forum party for instance campaigned on the slogan "Parties are for party members, Civic Forum is for everybody". Many populists in this region claimed that a "real" revolution had not occurred during the transition from Marxist–Leninist to liberal democratic governance in the early 1990s and that it was they who were campaigning for such a change. The collapse of Marxism–Leninism as a central force in socialist politics also led to a broader growth of left-wing populism across Europe, reflected in groups like the Dutch Socialist Party, Scottish Socialist Party, and German's The Left party. Since the late 1980s, populist experiences emerged in Spain around the figures of José María Ruiz Mateos, Jesús Gil and Mario Conde, businessmen who entered politics chiefly to defend their personal economic interests, but by the turn of the millennium their proposals had proved to meet a limited support at the ballots at the national level.

=== Germany ===
Friedrich Ludwig Jahn (1778–1852), a Lutheran Minister, a professor at the University of Berlin and the "father of gymnastics", introduced the concept of Volkstum, a racial notion which draws on the essence of a people that was lost during the Industrial Revolution. Adam Mueller went a step further by positing the belief that the state was a larger totality than the government institutions. This paternalistic vision of aristocracy concerned with social orders had a dark side in that the opposite force of modernity was represented by the Jews, who were said to be eating away at the state. Populism also played a role in mobilizing middle class support for the Nazi Party in Weimar Germany.

At the turn of the 21st century, populist rhetoric and movements became increasingly visible in Western Europe. Populist language was often employed by opposition parties. For example, during the 2001 general election campaign, Conservative Party leader William Hague accused Tony Blair’s Labour government of representing "the condescending liberal elite". Hague frequently described it as "metropolitan", suggesting it was disconnected from "the people", who in Conservative discourse were represented by "Middle England". Blair's government also occasionally employed populist themes; for instance, in its efforts to ban fox hunting on animal welfare grounds, it portrayed itself as defending the interests of the majority against the upper classes who participated in the sport. Blair’s rhetoric has been described as the adoption of a populist style rather than the expression of a populist ideology.

By the early 21st century, European populism was once again largely associated with the political right. The term came to be applied to both radical right parties, such as Jörg Haider’s Freedom Party of Austria (FPÖ) and Jean-Marie Le Pen’s of the National Front (FN) in France, as well as to non-radical right parties like Silvio Berlusconi’s Forza Italia in Italy and Pim Fortuyn’s List Pim Fortuyn (LPF) in the Netherlands. This combined populism with elements of authoritarianism and nativism.

Conversely, the Great Recession of the late 2000s and early 2010s contributed to the rise of left-wing populist movements in several European countries, most notably Syriza in Greece and Podemos in Spain. These parties shared certain similarities with the U.S.-based Occupy movement. Like their right-wing counterparts, they expressed Eurosceptic sentiment toward the European Union, though largely from socialist and anti-austerity perspectives rather than nationalist ones.

In 2021, the YouGov–Cambridge Globalism Project reported a sustained three-year decline in populist beliefs across ten European countries. Political scientists involved in the study described this as evidence of “a clear pattern of decreasing support for populism.”

=== France ===
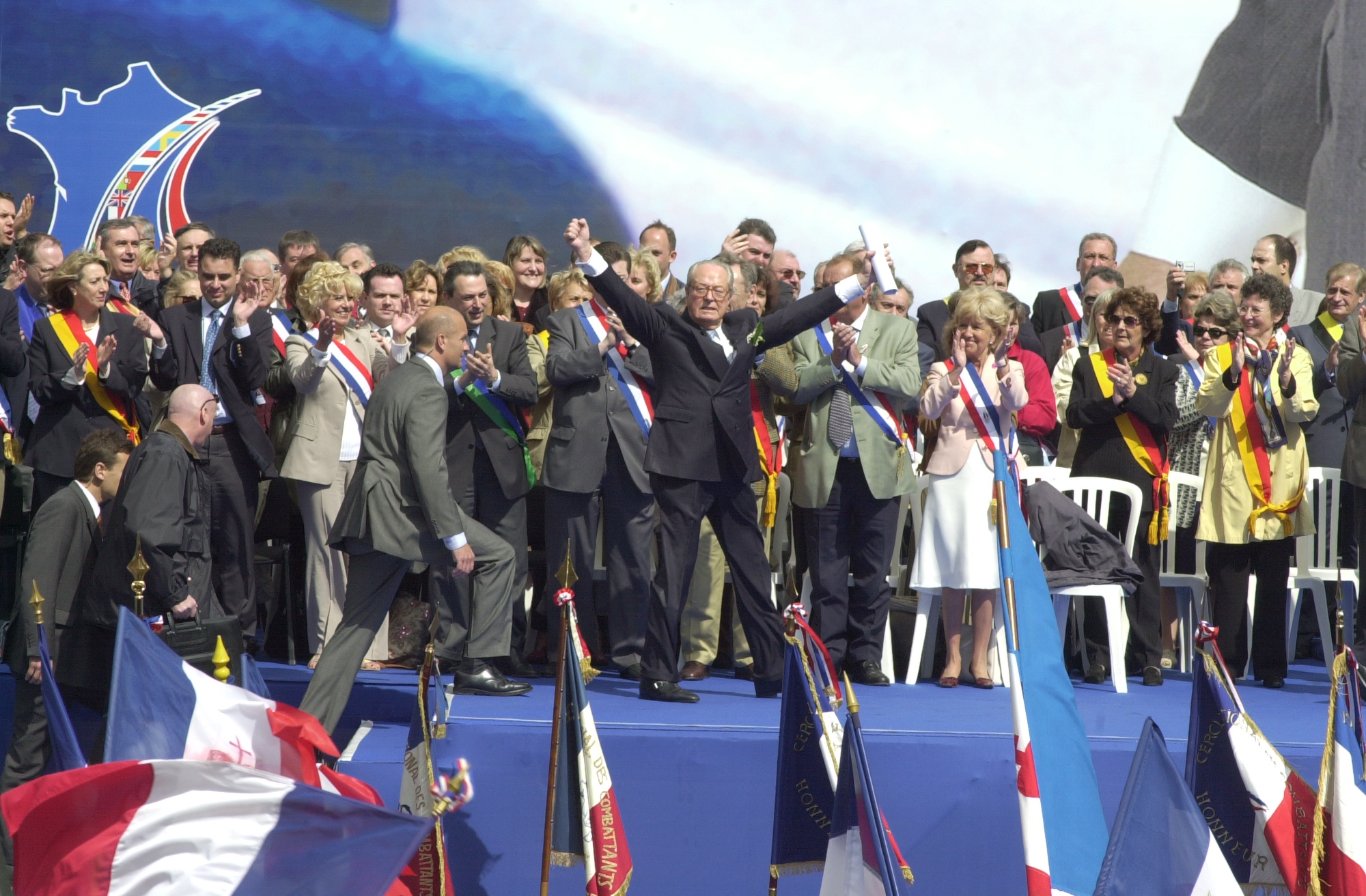
Jean-Marie Le Pen, founder and leader of the French National Front, the "prototypical radical right party" which used populism to advance its cause

The Rassemblement National (RN), formerly the Front National (FN), is a French far-right party chaired by Jean-Marie Le Pen (1972–2011), followed by his daughter Marine Le Pen (2011–2021), and currently by Jordan Bardella since 2021. The party was founded by Jean-Marie Le Pen alongside neo-Nazi sympathizers and members of the neo-fascist group New Order (Ordre Nouveau), aiming to unite small far-right groups and normalize their ideas among the French electorate. Today, the party is distinguished by its French nationalism, anti-immigration stance, xenophobic rhetoric, and anti-Islamic speeches, which are characteristic of right-wing populist ideologies.

La France Insoumise (LFI), a left-wing party, was founded in 2016 with Jean-Luc Mélenchon as its representative. Mélenchon, who accepts the populist label, advocates for ecosocialist, anti-liberal, and protectionist ideologies, positioning LFI as a left-wing populist opposition to the right-wing populist RN and the presidential party. In 2024, the party joined the alliance of left-wing parties, Nouveau Front Populaire (NFP), for the 2024 legislative elections.

=== Germany ===
The rise of political parties such as the Alternative für Deutschland (AfD) and the left-wing populist party, Die Linke, has demonstrated that their presence is electorally significant. They have achieved substantial electoral success at both the state and federal levels.

Die Linke was established in 2007 through the merger of the Party of Democratic Socialism (PDS) and the Labour and Social Justice The Electoral Alternative (WASG). Since then, the party has promoted its vision of democratic socialism, including a strong criticism of Germany’s existing social-market economic model. The party achieved a significant breakthrough in the 2009 Bundestag election, but the continuing refugee crisis in Europe exposed deep internal divisions within Die Linke.These tensions contributed to the party’s electoral decline in the 2019 European Parliamentary elections, where it received only 5.5% of the vote. In response to the broader political effects of the refugee crisis, Die Linke emphasized the need for a “solidary immigration society” and argued that the European Union has increasingly moved toward a model of neoliberal capitalism.

The (AfD) originated as an anti-EU party engaging in populist rhetoric. As a result, figures within the party, such as current leader Alice Weidel, have adopted more anti-establishment rhetoric. The emergence of the (AfD) in the German party system has led to the party being classified as a populist right-wing party. It became the third largest political party in 2017 and 2019 federal elections. It's currently the second-largest political party as of 2025 in the German Bundestag. This was by presenting themselves as a political alternative to the established political system. In recent years, the party has shifted to more right-wing positions influenced by Germany's refugee crisis. The (AfD) increasingly emphasized the primacy of the nation as its core guarantee for supporting and maintaining popular sovereignty and the rights of citizens.

=== Austria ===
The Austrian Freedom party (FPÖ) was formed from the remnants of the longstanding League of Independents (VdU). The party was primarily made up of German Nationalists and former Nazis who saw Austria both as part of the German Kulturnation and as its own, self-governing state. In its contemporary form, the party is characterized by Austrian nationalism, Euroscepticism, anti-immigration, and anti-Islamic attitudes (all traits commonly associated with right-wing populist ideologies).

=== Italy ===
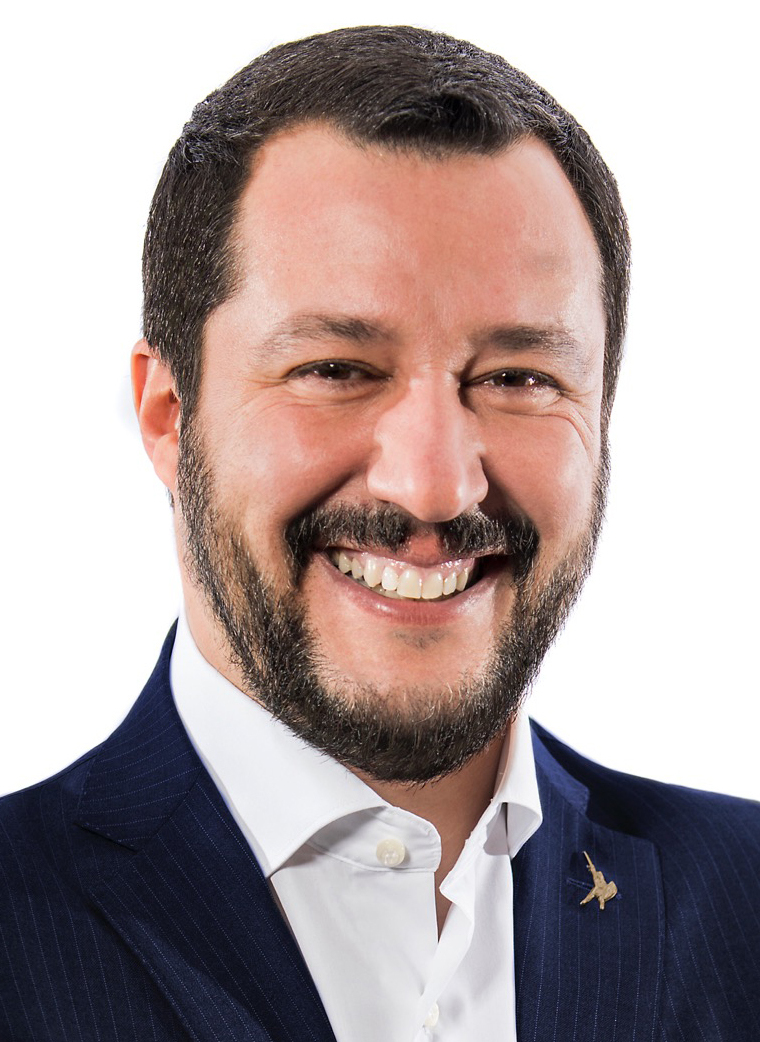
Italy's Deputy Prime Minister and League's leader, Matteo Salvini, is considered one of the most prominent right-wing populist politicians in Europe.

When Silvio Berlusconi entered politics in 1994 with his new party Forza Italia, he created a new kind of populism focused on media control. Berlusconi and his allies won three elections, in 1994, 2001 and, with his new right-wing People of Freedom party, in 2008; he was Prime Minister of Italy for almost ten years. Throughout its existence, Berlusconi's party was characterised by a strong reliance on the personal image and charisma of its leader—it has therefore been called a "personality party" or Berlusconi's "personal party"—and the skillful use of media campaigns, especially via television. The party's organisation and ideology depended heavily on its leader. Its appeal to voters was based on Berlusconi's personality more than on its ideology or programme.

Italy's most prominent right-wing populist party is Lega Nord (LN). The League started as a federalist, regionalist and sometimes secessionist party, founded in 1991 as a federation of several regional parties of Northern and Central Italy, most of which had arisen and expanded during the 1980s. LN's program advocates the transformation of Italy into a federal state, fiscal federalism and greater regional autonomy, especially for the Northern regions. At times, the party has advocated for the secession of the North, which it calls Padania. Certain LN members have been known to publicly deploy the offensive slur "terrone", a common pejorative term for Southern Italians that is evocative of negative Southern Italian stereotypes. With the rise of immigration into Italy since the late 1990s, LN has increasingly turned its attention to criticizing mass immigration to Italy. The LN, which also opposes illegal immigration, is critical of Islam and proposes Italy's exit from the eurozone. Since 2013, under the leadership of Matteo Salvini, the party has to some extent embraced Italian nationalism and emphasised Euroscepticism, opposition to immigration and other "populist" policies, while forming an alliance with right-wing populist parties in Europe.

In 2009, former comedian, blogger and activist Beppe Grillo founded the Five Star Movement. It advocates direct democracy and free access to the Internet, and condemns corruption. The M5S's programme also contains elements of both left-wing and right-wing populism and American-style libertarianism. The party is considered populist, ecologist, and partially Eurosceptic. Grillo himself described the Five Star Movement as being populist in nature during a political meeting he held in Rome on 30 October 2013. In the 2013 Italian election the Five Star Movement gained 25.5% of the vote, with 109 deputies and 54 senators, becoming the main populist and Eurosceptic party in the European Union.

The 2018 Italian general election was characterized by a strong showing by populist movements like Salvini's League and Luigi Di Maio’s Five Stars. In June, the two populist parties formed a government led by Giuseppe Conte.

=== United Kingdom ===
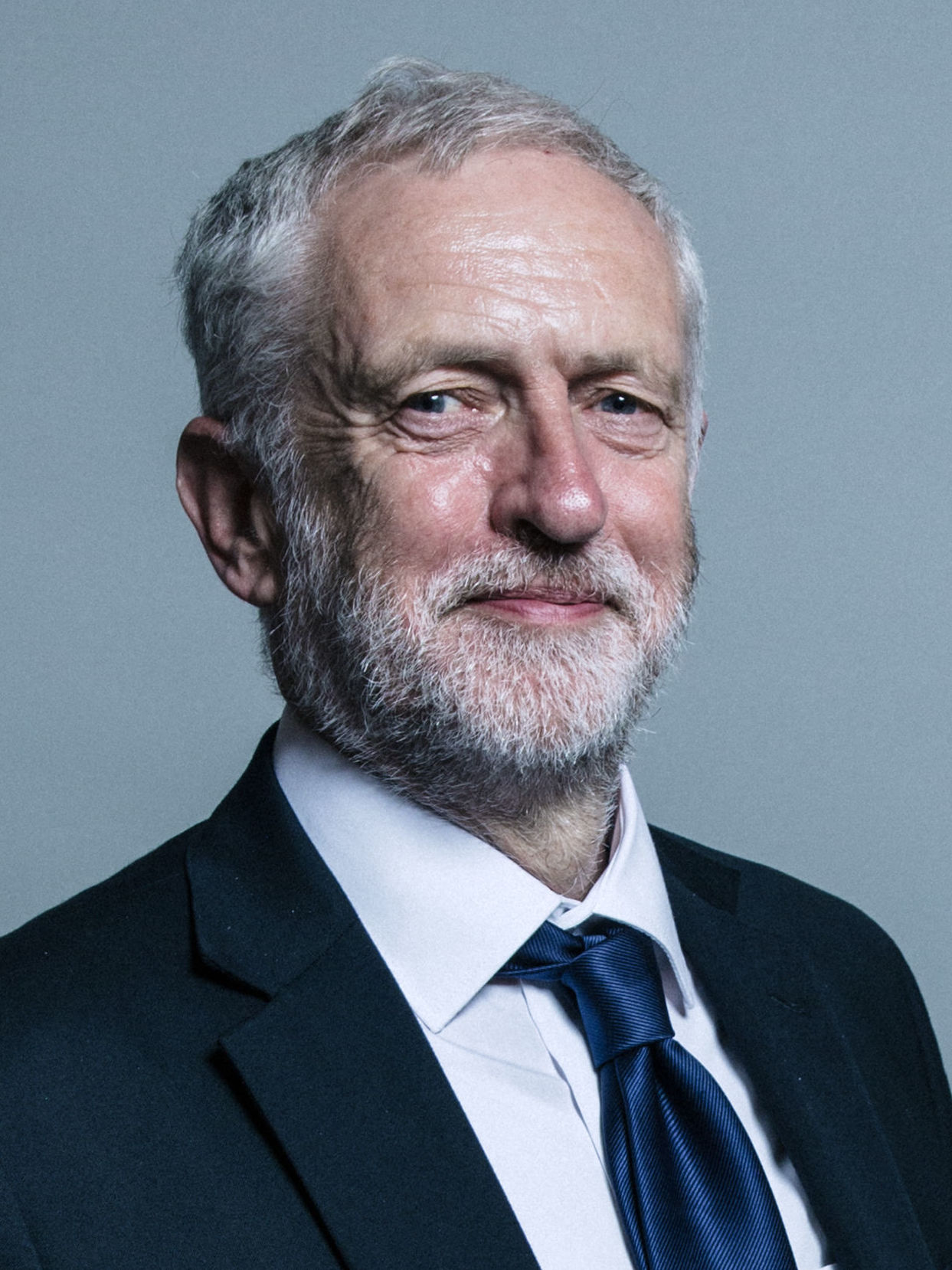
Jeremy Corbyn, former leader of the Labour Party

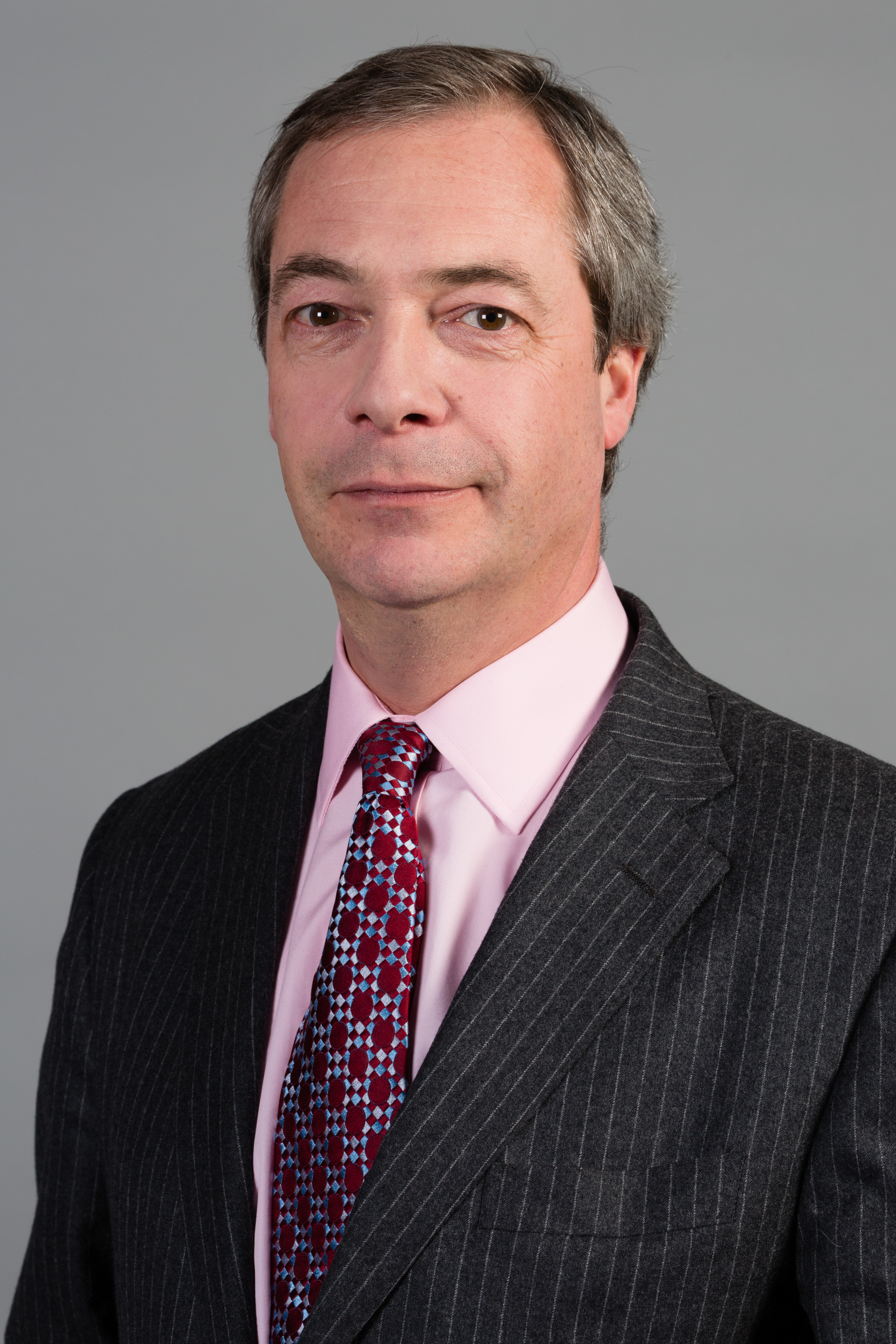
Nigel Farage, leader of the right-wing populist parties UKIP, Brexit Party, and Reform UK

The United Kingdom Independence Party (UKIP) was characterised as a right-wing populist party. The party achieved success leading up to the Brexit referendum under the direction of Nigel Farage. The party capitalised on the increasing immigration concerns in the UK following the EU enlargement of 2004. The Brexit referendum, in which British citizens voted to leave the European Union, was claimed as a victory for populism, encouraging a flurry of calls for referendums among other EU countries by populist political parties.

UKIP was succeeded by the Brexit Party in the lead up to the 2019 European Parliament elections in the United Kingdom. The Brexit Party was then followed by Reform UK, which continued to follow populist sentiments in its campaigning, particularly during the 2024 United Kingdom general election where the party found increased success at the expense of the establishment Conservative Party.

The UK Labour Party under the leadership of Jeremy Corbyn had been referred to as populist, with the slogan "for the many not the few" having been used.

Jeremy Corbyn identifies himself as part of the socialist left of the Labour Party and was elected as leader in 2015. During his time as Labour leader, he contested two general elections in 2017 and 2019 under manifestos that would have represented a political shift in the United Kingdom. These manifestos proposed issues related to foreign policy and economic policy, such as nationalization of parts of the private sector that would have changed certain private programs into public ownership such as rail, water, and energy. The Labour Party under Corbyn spoke about a lack of trust in the UK establishment and how this transformation was needed. Anti-elitist rhetoric has come up among other UK political leaders. Nigel Farage has often criticized establishment political parties, a theme that is the platform of his Reform UK party.

Other conservative Prime Ministers have used anti-elite language in describing people who opposed them. During the Brexit referendum in parliament, Boris Johnson employed anti-parliamentary rhetoric, portraying members of parliament as enemies of the people for not getting the vote done. This type of narrative forms an approach known as the Manichean worldview, an understanding that politics is a struggle between the people vs the elite.

== See also ==
- White backlash
- Immigration to Europe
- Radical right (Europe)
