= David Roediger =

American historian (born 1952)

David R. Roediger
- Born: July 13, 1952 (age 74); Columbia, Illinois, U.S.
- Education: Northern Illinois University; Northwestern University (PhD)
- Occupation: Historian
- Organization: University of Illinois at Urbana-Champaign

David R. Roediger (born July 13, 1952) is the Foundation Distinguished Professor of American Studies and History at the University of Kansas, where he has been since the fall of 2014. Previously, he was an American Kendrick C. Babcock Professor of History at the University of Illinois at Urbana-Champaign (UIUC). His research interests include the construction of racial identity, class structures, labor studies, and the history of American radicalism.

== Early life and education ==
Roediger was born on July 13, 1952, in Columbia, Illinois. He attended local public schools through high school. He earned a Bachelor of Science degree in education from Northern Illinois University in 1975. He went on to do graduate study and earned a PhD in history from Northwestern University in 1980, where he wrote a dissertation under the direction of George M. Fredrickson.

== Academic career ==
He was assistant editor of the Frederick Douglass Papers at Yale University from 1979 to 1980.

After receiving his doctorate, Roediger was a lecturer and assistant professor of history at Northwestern University from 1980 to 1985. He served as an assistant professor at the University of Missouri in 1985, rising to full professor in 1992. He moved to the University of Minnesota in 1995, and was chair of the university's American Studies Program from 1996 to 2000.

In 2000, he was appointed professor of history at the University of Illinois at Urbana-Champaign. Roediger has also served as the director for the Center on Democracy in a Multiracial Society at UIUC. Beginning in the fall of 2014, he has been the Foundation Distinguished Professor of American Studies and History at the University of Kansas. Roediger is a member of the board of directors of the Charles H Kerr Company Publishers, a position he has held since 1992.

== Research ==
Roediger's research interests primarily concern race and class in the United States, although he has also written on radicalism in American history and politics.

In 1989, Roediger and historian Philip Foner co-authored Our Own Time: A History of American Labor and the Working Day, a book that provides a highly detailed account of the movement to shorten the working day in the United States. The work broke new ground by combining labor history with a study of culture and the nature of work. The book also extended the history of the eight-hour day movement to colonial times. The authors argued that debate over the length of the work-day or work-week has been the central issue of the American labor movement during periods of high growth.

=== The Wages of Whiteness ===
Roediger's book, The Wages of Whiteness: Race and the Making of the American Working Class, was published in 1991 and is considered one of the most influential works in the field of whiteness studies. Wages of Whiteness won the Merle Curti Award in 1992 from the Organization of American Historians, for the best work of social history in 1991.

Theodore W. Allen's "Class Struggle and the Origin of Racial Slavery: The Invention of the White Race" (1975), a pamphlet that later was expanded into his seminal two-volume work The Invention of the White Race, Vol. 1: Racial Oppression and Social Control (1994, 2012) and The Invention of the White Race, Vol. 2: "The Origin of Racial Oppression in Anglo-America" (1997, 2012); has also been influential in this field. The argument was also in some regards anticipated by Abram Lincoln Harris' radical scholarship in the 1920s. (Note: See, for example, this argument from Harris: An ill founded fear of seditious combination between outnumbering Negro slaves and landless whites led the dominant whites to foster and augment race distinctions just as many modern employers maintain a definite proportion of representatives of different races and nationalities as a bulwark against labor organization and as others, more ruthless, exploit race antipathy upon the theory of divide et impera Also from Allen: “the opposition to slavery which emanated from the Northwest and the eastern wage-earners was caused by their recognition of a fundamental antagonism of interest between the slavery system and free labor rather than by their humanitarism. As a matter of fact the northern wage-earners were as hostile to Negro freemen as to the slaves. The mobbing of Negroes was quite a common occurrence in the northern and middlewestern cities during the pre-civil war period." [here, Allen cites LIFE AND TIMES OF FREDERICK DOUGLASS, Part I, Ch. 20 and Part II, Ch. 5. Also THE NEW YORK RIOTS]" (472).) Allen later wrote of Roediger's work:

...because of its almost universal acceptance for use in colleges and universities, has served as the single most effective instrument in the socially necessary consciousness-raising function of objectifying 'whiteness,' and in popularizing the 'race-as-a-social-construct' thesis. As one who has been the beneficiary of kind supportive comments from him for my own efforts in this field of historical investigation, I undertake this critical essay with no other purpose than furthering our common aim of the disestablishment of white identity, and the overthrow of white supremacism in general.

In the work, Roediger argued that "whiteness" is a historical phenomenon in the United States, as many different ethnicities now considered "white" were not initially perceived as such here. The Irish, for example, as Roman Catholics and from rural areas, were not considered "white" – meaning accepted as members of the Anglo-American Protestant majority society – until they began to distinguish themselves from black slaves and freedmen; from the New York Draft riots of 1863, to riots in Philadelphia against black voting, and the Chicago Race riot of 1919, ethnic Irish were prominent in violent confrontations against black Americans, with whom they competed for jobs, physical territory and political power. Roediger believes their struggle reflects the emergence of the modern theory of Color Consciousness, through which notions of "nations" and "races" were increasingly linked to color as the primary category of human difference. Roediger claims that the social construction of the concept of a white race in the United States was a conscious effort by slave owners to gain distance from those they enslaved, who were generally non-European and non-Christian. In addition, white working peoples gained distance from their Southern proletarian complements, the slaves. By the 18th century, he says, "white" had become well-established as a racial term in the United States; by the end of the 19th, it had become an all-encompassing one.

=== Recent work ===
Roediger is researching the interrelation between labor management and the formation of racial identities in the U.S.

=== Awards ===
- 1992, the Merle Curti Award for his book, The Wages of Whiteness: Race and the Making of the American Working Class, by the Organization of American Historians.
- 1999, the Carlton C. Qualey Memorial Award for his article "Inbetween Peoples," co-authored with James Barrett. The award is given by the Immigration and Ethnic History Society for the best article in the Journal of American Ethnic History.

== Bibliography ==
=== As sole author ===
- The Sinking Middle Class: A Political History. New York: OR Books. 2020.
- Class, Race, and Marxism. New York: Verso. 2017.
- Seizing Freedom: Slave Emancipation and Liberty for All. New York: Verso. 2014. ISBN 9781781686096.
- How Race Survived U.S. History: From Settlement and Slavery to the Obama Phenomenon. New York: Verso. 2008.
- History Against Misery. Chicago, Illinois: Charles H. Kerr Company. 2006. ISBN 0-88286-305-3.
- Working Toward Whiteness: How America's Immigrants Became White. The Strange Journey from Ellis Island to the Suburbs. New York: Basic Books. 2005. ISBN 9780465070732.
- Colored White: Transcending the Racial Past. Berkeley, California: University of California Press. 2002. ISBN 0-520-24070-7.
- Towards the Abolition of Whiteness: Essays on Race, Class and Politics. London, UK, and New York: Verso Books. 1994. ISBN 0-86091-658-8.
- The Wages of Whiteness: Race and the Making of the American Working Class. Rev. ed. London, UK and New York: Verso Books. 1999. ISBN 1-85984-240-2.

=== Co-authored works ===
- with Elizabeth Esch, The Production of Difference: Race and The Management of Labor in U.S. History. Oxford: Oxford University P, 2012. ISBN 9780199739752
- with Philip S. Foner, Our Own Time: A History of American Labor and the Working Day. Greenwood, Colo.: Greenwood Press, 1989. ISBN 0-313-26062-1
- with Tyler Stallings, Amelia Jones, Amelia, and Ken Gonzales-Day, Whiteness: A Wayward Construction. Laguna Beach, Calif.: Laguna Art Museum, 2003. ISBN 0-911291-31-8

=== Works edited ===
- with Martin Blatt, The Meaning of Slavery in the North. New York: Garland, 1998. ISBN 0-8153-3758-2
- with Ronald C. Kent, Sara Markham, and Herbert Shapiro, Culture, Gender, Race, and U.S. Labor History. Greenwood, Colo.: Greenwood Press, 1993. ISBN 0-313-28828-3
- Black on White: Black Writers on What It Means to Be White. Paperback edn New York: Schocken Books, 1999. ISBN 0-8052-1114-4
- Fellow Worker: The Life of Fred Thompson, By Fred Thompson. Chicago: Charles H. Kerr Publishing Co., 1993. ISBN 0-88286-220-0
- John Brown, By W.E.B. DuBois. New York: Random House, 2001. ISBN 0-679-78353-9
- Labor Struggles in the Deep South, By Covington Hall. Chicago: Charles H. Kerr Publishing Company, 1999. ISBN 0-88286-244-8
- with Rosemont, Franklin, Haymarket Scrapbook. Chicago: Charles H. Kerr Publishing Co., 1986. ISBN 0-88286-147-6
- with Archie Green, Franklin Rosemont, and Salvatore Salerno. The Big Red Songbook. Chicago: Charles H. Kerr Publishing Co., 2007. ISBN 0-88286-277-4
- The Best American History Essays 2008. New York: Palgrave MacMillan, 2008. ISBN 0-230-60591-5
- with Martin Smith, Listening to Revolt: Selected Writings of George Rawick. Chicago: Charles H. Kerr Publishing Co., 2010. ISBN 0-88286-318-5
- with Jeremy Krikler and Wulf D. Hund, Wages of Whiteness & Racist Symbolic Capital, Berlin: Lit, 2010. ISBN 978-3-643-10949-1
