= Rutledge Dennis =

American sociologist (born 1939)

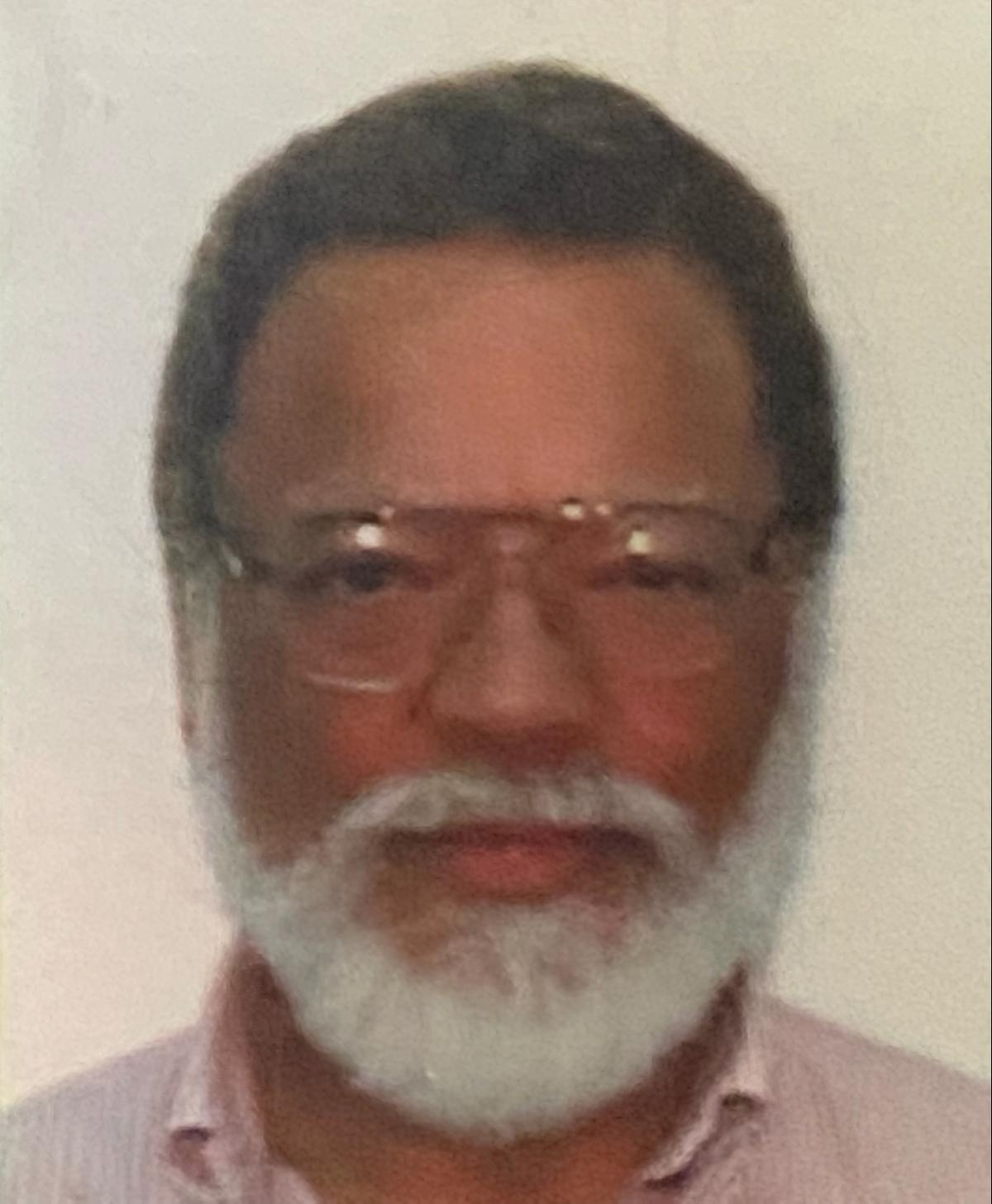
- Born: Rutledge Melvin Dennis; August 16, 1939 (age 86); Charleston, South Carolina
- Education: South Carolina State University; Washington State University
- Known for: Scholarship on W. E. B. Du Bois
- Awards: American Sociological Association DuBois-Johnson-Frazier Award (2006)
- Scientific career
- Fields: Sociology
- Institutions: Virginia Commonwealth University; George Mason University
- Thesis: The Sociology of W. E. B. Du Bois (1975)

Rutledge Melvin Dennis (born August 16, 1939) is an American sociologist who is Professor of Sociology and Anthropology at George Mason University. A noted expert on the work of W. E. B. Du Bois, he was formerly the first coordinator of African American studies at Virginia Commonwealth University. He was the president of the Association of Black Sociologists from 1982 to 1983. In 2001, he received the Association's Joseph S. Himes Distinguished Scholarship Award. In 2006, he received the DuBois-Johnson-Frazier Award from the American Sociological Association. The statement accompanying this award described Dennis as "one of the leading scholars on DuBois." In 2010, he created the Dennis-Weathers award in honor of his parents and godparents. The award is given annually by Virginia Commonwealth University to an exemplary African American studies student.
