= Residents Against Racism =

Irish advocacy group supporting asylum seekers and opposing racism

Residents Against Racism is a group that lobbies on behalf of asylum seekers in Ireland. Residents Against Racism has been campaigning since 1998 and is not connected to any political party and does not receive any state funding. It is frequently critical of populist politicians and the Garda Síochána. It often campaigns against specific deportations that it regards as unjust, usually those of children. Its supporters include Patricia McKenna, Joe Costello, and Aengus Ó Snodaigh.
