= Color consciousness =

Color consciousness is a theory stating that equality under the law is insufficient to address racial inequalities in society. It rejects the concept of fundamental racial differences, but holds that physical differences such as skin color can and do negatively impact some people's life opportunities.

United States Supreme Court Justice Harry Blackmun in 1978, stated, "In order to get beyond racism, we must first take account of race. There is no other way. And in order to treat some persons equally, we must treat them differently" (Regents of the University of California v. Bakke).

David R. Roediger in his book Wages of Whiteness draws a distinction between black and white wage workers in the 19th century:

As early as 1807, the British investor Charles W. Janson published the indignant replies he had received when he visited an acquaintance in New England and asked the maid who answered the door, 'Is your master home?' Not only did the maid make it clear that she had 'no master' but she insisted, 'I am Mr. ____'s help. I'd have you to know, man, that I am no sarvant; none but negars are sarvants.'

This distinction between free black and white wage workers shows a kind of negative color consciousness, in which the white "help" insists on being recognized as a white person, since she is therefore higher in the social hierarchy even though she is employed as an unskilled laborer. That contrasts with modern notions of positive color consciousness, through such endeavors as affirmative action, to bolster those who were disadvantaged by their race.

== See also ==
- Color blindness (race)
- Identity politics
- Race-conscious policy
