= Anti-apartheid movement =

Anti-apartheid movement may refer to:

- Anti-Apartheid Movement, the British organisation that led international opposition to Apartheid
- Anti-apartheid movement in the United States
- Internal resistance to apartheid, protests and opposition to Apartheid within South Africa
