= Twain–Ament indemnities controversy =

Controversy in 1900 over missionary activity in China

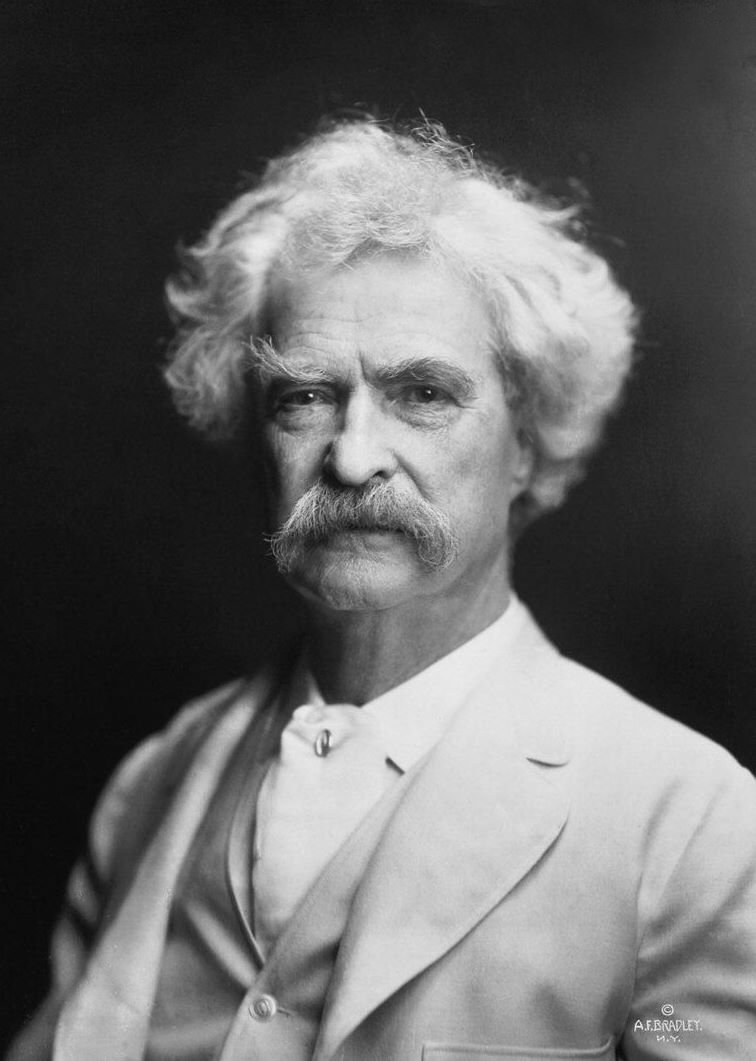
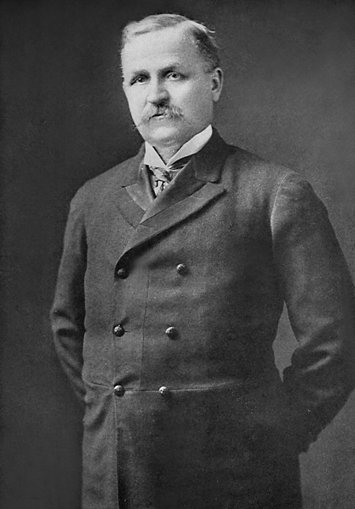
- Mark Twain in 1907 William Scott Ament circa 1905
- Date: 1901
- Caused by: Ament and other missionaries' collection of indemnities in excess of losses following the Boxer Rebellion
- Medium: Press editorials
- Status: Inconclusive. Foreign Christian Missionary Society alleges financial losses while the American Board of Commissioners for Foreign Missions alleges financial benefit from the feud.

Parties
Mark Twain; Wilbur Chamberlin; Anti-Imperialist League of New York; Thomas Franklin Fairfax Millard; John Ames Mitchell; Charles Fletcher Lummis; Socialist Party of America	William Scott Ament; Alphonse Favier; Elwood Gardner Tewksbury; 6th Cavalry Regiment; Judson Smith; Gilbert Reid; American Board of Commissioners for Foreign Missions; Peking Missionary Society; Henry L. Stimson; Edwin H. Conger; Claude MacDonald; Charles Harvey Denby

Works
"To the Person Sitting in Darkness"; "To My Missionary Critics"	

The Twain–Ament indemnities controversy was a major cause célèbre in the United States of America in 1901 as a consequence of the published reactions of American humorist Mark Twain to reports of Rev. William Scott Ament and other missionaries collecting indemnities (in excess of losses) from Chinese people in the aftermath of the Boxer Uprising.

== Origins of the Controversy ==
In 1900, attacks took place across China in connection with the Boxer Rebellion which targeted Christians and foreigners. Many missionaries with their children, as well as native Christians were killed and much property was destroyed. While most missionaries, including those of the largest affected mission agency, the China Inland Mission led by Hudson Taylor, refused to even accept payment for loss of property or life "in order to demonstrate the meekness of Christ to the Chinese" when the allied nations were demanding compensation from the Chinese government, not all missionaries acted with similar restraint.

In 1901, veteran American Board of Commissioners for Foreign Missions missionary Rev. Dr. William Scott Ament, who had served in China since 1877, became embroiled in a controversy regarding his activities (and those of other Christian missionaries, including Pierre-Marie-Alphonse Favier, Roman Catholic Vicar Apostolic of Northern Chi-li) subsequent to the Boxer Uprising. "In the war's aftermath came a war of words. Missionary triumphalism clashed with the sarcastic sallies of Mark Twain, who lampooned the apologias for looting given by American missionary William Scott Ament."

=== Ament's attitude and actions ===
While Ament through his own personal initiative was able to rescue the ABCFM missionaries at Tungchow, there was still significant loss of lives. Thirteen ABCFM adult missionaries and five children were killed by the Boxers. Included were Mary Susan Morrill (born 1863 in Portland, Maine) and Annie Allender Gould, were among the eleven foreign missionaries, four children, and about fifty Chinese Christians killed in Baoding from 30 June 1900. Additionally, there was much damage to ABCFM property. The ABCFM Mission compound was razed, as was the Emily Ament Memorial School (named in honor of Ament's daughter) on Sixth Street, Peking. Ament estimated that by the end of July 1900 that losses for the ABCFM Peking station was about $71,000 gold.

==== Occupation of the Mongolian Fu ====
On 11 August 1900, Ament indicated in a letter to his wife that:

Mr. Conger told me to-day that on the arrival of the troops he would see that we – our mission – had given over to us that Mongol Fu – palace – just east of us on Teng Shih K'ou.... Our poor people – those who are saved – not many, must be settled in homes and efforts made to secure indemnity for them as well as for ourselves. My heart bleeds for them. They are aliens in their own country and pronounced as "bandits" by imperial decree.

Ament was able to occupy the Mongolian Fu, a suspected Boxer headquarters adjacent to the ABCFM chapel, by 20 August 1900. Ament was able to write to his wife:

I have here about two hundred Christian refugees, poor worn persecuted ones whom I am feeding on food taken from the rich families near by. They ought to suffer in view of all the misery they have created.... Our poor people come in with their tales of woe which would break a heart of stone. Many have been killed and I shall act as avenger if I can meet the brutes in human form. No one thinks that mercy should be shown them.

==== Demand for indemnities ====
On 20 August 1900, Ament with nineteen other American Protestant missionaries sent a note to United States Minister, Edwin H. Conger, demanding:

indemnity for native Christians for loss of life and property, education reforms in China, abolition of the literacy test of merit in the civil service and the introduction of suitable branches of Western learning, abolition of the worship of Confucius as a compulsory rite, and reforms of criminal civil processes so that non-Christians and alike Christians had the same rights in court etc.

These demands were transmitted to John Hay (8 October 1838; 1 July 1905), United States Secretary of State (1898–1905), with only the demands for indemnities and the abolition of the examination system ultimately included in the Boxer Protocol. According to Wong:

Ament explained that to demand China entering upon a course of reform at the direction and practically under the direction of foreign powers would certainly be most irritating and militate ultimately against the constantly essential doctrine of preserving the integrity of the empire. China must be left to work out her own salvation by her own method.

On 25 August 1900, Ament revealed his plans to punish the Boxers for their actions:

The city is stagnant and only very slowly are people coming out of hiding. I shall soon begin some punitive measures on Boxers. China seems a ruined country. We may all have to leave. Our people from the country and the region of Shantung come with horrible stories of Boxer cruelties. Our churches are simply wiped out. Only a small remnant will remain. We must reconstruct as best we can. We find buried silver in good quantities and plenty of grain, so that our people have plenty to eat and to wear.

Again, Ament indicated:

Boxer leaders must be sought out and punished so far as possible. I shall begin in that line soon. It would not be right for such men to remain unpunished.

==== Collection of indemnities ====
From 13 September 1900, Ament, and a colleague, Reverend Elwood Gardner Tewksbury, accompanied by the U.S. 6th Cavalry, searched the areas adjacent to Beijing for Boxers, collecting indemnities for Christians who had been killed by the Boxers, and ordering the burning of some homes and even allegedly executing suspected Boxers. Ament had been chosen by his fellow missionaries "as the one who would be honorable and just to all." Ament reported to Mary, his wife, on 18 September 1900:

I have been absent on an expedition for five days.... Captain Forsythe and two hundred cavalry troops went – I as guide and interpreter – to Sha Ho and other places east of Peking. We burned two Boxer headquarters, destroyed some arms and brought in sixteen refugees, Christians who had been in hiding.

On 1 January 1901, Ament, writing to his wife, confided:

I led a troop of horsemen through San Ho District, and because I wanted certain Boxers hunted out and punished I was spoken of as vindictive and bloodthirsty. Now it comes out that this expedition has to be repeated, because of the softness of the Americans in dealing with the Chinese!

Ament is quoted as advocating the necessity of the use of force to ensure genuine regret among the Chinese: "If you deal with the Chinese with a soft hand, they will take advantage of it."

In a letter to ABCFM corresponding secretary Dr. Judson Smith of 13 November 1900 (received by Smith on 7 January 1901), Ament wrote:

I have been in Cho Chou. This time I proposed to settle affairs without the aid of soldiers or legations. It was a complete success. Every one of our dispossessed church-members has been reinstated and a money compensation made for his losses. This has been done by appealing to the sense of justice among the villages where our people lived and where they are respected by all decent people. The villagers were extremely grateful because I brought no foreign soldiers and were glad to settle on the terms proposed. After our conditions were known many villagers came of their own accord and brought their money with them.

Apparently, the actions of Russian, French, and German soldiers, "who looted and killed on every hand, often taking delight in shooting every person visible ... determined Dr. Ament not to go again with soldiers in his efforts to secure the replacing of the Christian in their homes, or to enforce the reasonable demands for indemnity for the great losses sustained by the church-members." Ament wrote in a letter on 27 September 1900, about a month after the occupation of the Mongol Fu (palace): "I am selling off the bric-a-brac, silks, furs found in the Fu for the benefit of the Christians."

Ament, writing to Rev. Dr. Judson Smith on 27 December 1900, before he became aware of any criticism, gave this account of the collection of indemnities:

After a month of very hard work, I am glad to report progress to you. I visited – beginning on the south – Wen An, Pao Ting Hsien, Pa Chou, P'ing Ting, Cho Chou, Liang Hsiang, and on the east, Shun Yi. I found the officials in all these places exceedingly friendly and anxious to settle the affairs of the converts, recognizing the right and the need of such claims. I have made no use of foreign soldiers and brought no external pressure to bear, relying on the justice of our claims. Mr. Conger has supported us in the measures and methods taken, though the military people have not failed to make criticisms. The survivors in all our country stations have been recouped for all their losses, again reinstated in their villages, with some money in hand, and a promise of houses restored next spring. Over and above restoration for the converts there has been gathered a fund for the support of widows and orphans, who have no homes and have no one to look after them.

== Criticisms of Ament and his actions ==
=== Wilbur Chamberlin and New York Sun article (24 December 1900) ===
An interview that Wilbur Chamberlin of the New York Sun conducted with Ament elevated the indulgences issue into a cause célèbre. Chamberlin had first met Ament in Beijing on 14 October 1900. In a letter to his wife, Chamberlin indicated:

The Rev. A.[ment] is a missionary, and he appears to be a very good sort of a fellow, but I cannot for the life of me approve of his methods.... You see, when the soldiers came to Peking and these missionaries were safe, some of them began at once to clamor for damages that they said they had sustained. The first thing that they did was to get for living places the palaces of the rich Chinese Princes, and when they had them they started in clearing them out. They took everything of value and sold it for a song. Then they let their native Christians go out hunting and stealing more loot, and then they sold that. They said it was no sin and eased their consciences by saying they had the right to reimburse themselves for the losses they sustained. It was just as if a man had stolen something from me, and, to get square, I went and stole something from him. In other words, two wrongs make a right. That may be all right, but I don't think so. At A.'s home, which was the palace of Prince Pei, a Manchu, before the trouble, I met a lot more missionaries.

While Chamberlin thought it unlikely that the Sun publish his reports about the looting by missionaries and their followers, he felt that should they be printed that he would be:

roundly damned by a big proportion of ... the class that support the missionaries, some of whom out here have disgraced the Church and Christianity.... It had been my intention to write nothing at all about them unless I was ordered to do so.... It is sufficient to say that their conduct to-day is not improved in the least. They are still living in stolen houses and paying their expenses from the proceeds of the sale of their thefts. Some of them are still selling stuff that they individually stole or was stolen by their so-called Christians under their personal direction.

Chamberlin's report was subsequently published in the Christmas Eve 1900 edition of New York's The Sun newspaper. Chamberlin reported:

The Rev. Mr. Ament, of the American Board of Foreign Missions, has returned from a trip which he made for the purpose of collecting indemnities for damages done by Boxers. Everywhere he went he compelled the Chinese to pay. He says that all his native Christians are now provided for. He had 700 of them under his charge, and 300 were killed. He has collected 300 taels for each of these murders, and has compelled full payment for all the property belonging to Christians that was destroyed. He also assessed fines amounting to thirteen times the amount of the indemnity. This money will be used for the propagation of the Gospel.

Mr. Ament declares that the compensation he has collected is moderate, when compared with the amount secured by the Catholics, who demand, in addition to money, head for head. They collect 500 taels for each murder of a Catholic. In the Wenchiu country, 680 Catholics were killed, and for this the European Catholics here demand 750,000 strings of cash and 680 heads.

In the course of a conversation, Mr. Ament referred to the attitude of the missionaries toward the Chinese. He said:

I deny emphatically that the missionaries are vindictive, that they generally looted, or that they have done anything since the siege that the circumstances did not demand. I criticise the Americans. The soft hand of the Americans is not as good as the mailed fist of the Germans. If you deal with the Chinese with a soft hand they will take advantage of it.

The statement that the French Government will return the loot taken by the French soldiers, is the source of the greatest amusement here. The French soldiers were more systematic looters than the Germans, and it is a fact that to-day Catholic Christians, carrying French flags and armed with modern guns, are looting villages in the Province of Chili.

Chamberlin indicated in a letter to his wife dated 28 December 1900, that he had interviewed Ament that day about missionary looting, and that Ament believed he had done nothing for which he was ashamed. Chamberlin confided to his wife that:

He is the boss American missionary out here. He really is a fine man, and during the siege one of the bravest.... It was what happened after the siege was over, when the looting began, that I find fault with. At least, I don't find fault with it, but it seems to me that it needs explanation."

In a subsequent letter to his wife, dated 29 January 1901, Chamberlin indicates that:

A.[ment] tries to justify himself by saying that everyone did it, which doesn't seem to me to be a good defense at all. It is too much in the two-wrongs-make-a-right plan to suit your humble servant.

=== Mark Twain: "To the Person Sitting in Darkness" (February 1901) ===
Mark Twain was "an outspoken critic of American involvement in the Philippines and China", and "one of the mammoth figures in anti-imperialism, and certainly the foremost anti-imperialist literary figure" of his days, having become in January 1901 a vice president of the Anti-Imperialist League of New York.

Twain decided to use the Sun article as the basis of a sustained attack on both the missionary enterprise and its imperialist tendencies. "Twain lampooned missionary morality and likened it to questionable American activities in the Philippines". According to Foner, Twain used the conduct of Ament to "drive home the point that the missionary movement served as a front for imperialism. "Without any doubt 'To the Person Sitting in Darkness' is Twain's most famous anti-imperialist piece. The satire is incredibly dark and Twain does not hesitate to taunt those whom he considers to be immoral including McKinley as the "Master of the Game," the missionaries, and the trusts." The title of the article is "an ironic reference to Matthew 4:16 — "The people who sat in darkness have seen a great light"", "and used by the Christian missionaries when referring to the "savage", "heathen", "uncivilized" populations of the lands the imperialists were conquering." It was also a response the pro-imperialistic message in the poem The White Man's Burden written by Rudyard Kipling in response to the American annexation of the Philippines.F The title was "a play upon the idea of western civilization being "enlightened"". Kipling had used the image when he wrote of:

The cry of those ye humor
(Ah, slowly!) toward the light:—
'Why brought ye us from bondage,
Our loved Egyptian night?'

In this article, Twain especially targeted Ament. According to Susan Harris:

"To the Person Sitting in Darkness," which Mark Twain published in the North American Review in 1901, attacks Western imperialism as it was manifesting itself in South Africa, China, Cuba, and the Philippines. It names its villains – William McKinley, Joseph Chamberlain, the Kaiser, the Czar – and their instruments, especially the Reverend William Ament, a Congregationalist minister who was affiliated with the American Board of Commissioners for Foreign Missions.

According to Twain biographer Albert Bigelow Paine:

Twain, of course, was fiercely stirred. The missionary idea had seldom appealed to him, and coupled with this business of bloodshed, it was less attractive than usual. He printed the clippings in full, one following the other; then he said:

By happy luck we get all these glad tidings on Christmas Eve—just the time to enable us to celebrate the day with proper gaiety and enthusiasm. Our spirits soar and we find we can even make jokes; taels I win, heads you lose.

He went on to score Ament, to compare the missionary policy in China to that of the Pawnee Indians, and to propose for him a monument — subscriptions to be sent to the American Board. He denounced the national policies in Africa, China, and the Philippines, and showed by the reports and by the private letters of soldiers home, how cruel and barbarous and fiendish had been the warfare made by those whose avowed purpose was to carry the blessed light of civilization and Gospel "to the benighted native"—how in very truth these priceless blessings had been handed on the point of a bayonet to the "Person Sitting in Darkness". Mark Twain never wrote anything more scorching, more penetrating in its sarcasm, more fearful in its revelation of injustice and hypocrisy, than his article "To the Person Sitting in Darkness". He put aquafortis on all the raw places, and when it was finished he himself doubted the wisdom of printing it.

James Smylie somewhat whitewashed the controversy, saying, "Twain went after the respected Congregationalist minister, Reverend William Scott Ament, director of the American Board of Commissioners for Foreign Missions. Ament joined other powers in seeking indemnities from the Chinese after the Boxer Rebellion against western exploitation in 1900. Twain, perhaps unfairly, was shocked that Ament would use such blood money for the "propagation of the Gospel" and to promote the "blessings of civilization" to brothers and sisters who "sit in darkness." He summoned to missionaries: Come home and Christianize Christians in the states!"

== Reactions to the controversy ==
After its publication in The North American Review for February 1901, as the opening article, there was a huge controversy. This article "created a national sensation as well as a savage debate between Twain and the American Board of Foreign Missions; it is a masterful and satiric polemic condemning imperialism and the West for military intervention in China, South Africa, and the Philippines." According to Paine:

Every paper in England and America commented on it editorially, with bitter denunciations or with eager praise, according to their lights and convictions. At 14 West Tenth Street [Twain's residence] letters, newspaper clippings, documents poured in by the bushel—laudations, vituperations, denunciations, vindications; no such tumult ever occurred in a peaceful literary home. It was really as if he had thrown a great missile into the human hive, one-half of which regarded it as a ball of honey and the remainder as a cobblestone. Whatever other effect it may have had, it left no thinking person unawakened.

After its magazine publication, the Anti-Imperialist League of New York published the essay as a pamphlet and seems to have distributed as many as 125,000 copies. However:

Even within the Anti-Imperialist League, reaction to Mark Twain's essay was mixed. Though the League reprinted it as a pamphlet (it had the widest circulation of any League publication) League censors excised significant passages, included the author's quotation from the New York Sun on the prevailing squalor in the slums of Manhattan's Lower East Side, as well as his bitter condemnation of the activities of Christian missionaries in China.

=== Critics of Ament ===
==== The New York Times ====
On 26 January 1901, the editor of The New York Times, in an editorial entitled "Loot and Indemnity in China", after describing the "various unprovoked and unpunished acts of murder, arson, robbery and rape" by the Allied forces, attacked the missionaries in China as "the most vociferous plauditors of the operations, the most implacable demanders of Chinese blood" and indicated that "the accounts that have reached us have represented the missionaries as having been as active in the looting of Chinese property as they had been in instigating the promiscuous taking of Chinese lives."

Ament was arrested by German and French troops near Tungchow, and charged with trying to extort money from the Chinese villagers. On 5 February 1901, The New York Times reported that Ament had been arrested (along with two British subjects) on a charge of "endeavoring to extort money from the Chinese villagers" near Tungchow (now the Tongzhou District, Beijing). While the two British subjects were released, Ament was held pending an appeal to United States Minister Edwin H. Conger. Two days later, The Times reported that Ament "had been arrested by French and German officers on the painful charge of blackmailing Chinese villages.... The charge has terrible plausibility. Apparently the only relevant answer the inculpated missionary could make to the charge is the ancient rejoinder "You're another," which the other doubtless was. But what a predicament for a missionary to be placed in with reference to avowed looters."

The New York Times, in an editorial of 7 February 1901, echoed the previous criticisms of Ament: "The plain fact is that the ministers of the gospel of Christ have been a disturbing factor in the Chinese situation." Quoting the opinion of then British Prime Minister, the Marquess of Salisbury, who indicated that "missionaries in general have been an international nuisance", The Times indicated that "the missionaries in China were showing a vindictiveness, in respect to the outrages and the situation which did not exactly comport with the Gospel they professed to be spreading." The Times concludes: "Upon the whole, it seems safe to say, that the Rev, Mr. Ament has missed his vocation, and that, for the particular function which incumbed on him, of propagating the Christian Gospel in foreign parts, he was not the most eligible person that could have been imagined or even secured."

Ament was subsequently released at the direction of the German military commander, Count Alfred von Waldersee. Wilbur Chamberlin, a reporter for the New York Sun, sent to China, reported in a letter dated 9 February 1901 to his wife:

My missionary friend, the Rev. A.[ment], is out of limbo.... Quite a long time ago he had a scheme for collecting damages for all his native Christians and his church from the Chinese themselves. He went around to some forty villages and collected 80,000 taels. A few days ago he went back there and was promptly arrested at the instigation of some Roman Catholics. It appears they had the same sort of scheme, but A. got there first, and when they went around to these same villages to make their collections, they found out that he had all the money there was. Naturally, they were enraged, so they made complaint against A., and declared that he had been blackmailing the villages.... I really think, myself, that A. might have left a little for the Catholics. I don't like to see a man take it all, even if he is a missionary.

Chamberlin indicated that the French and Germans, under pressure from the Americans, released him, insisting that he was never under arrest.

On 31 March 1901, the New York Times reported that the collection of "private indemnities" by Ament and others in China might disqualify them from any claim for payments when the United States government tendered its indemnity claims on China. It further indicated that the United States government could not make any claims for Chinese Christians as they were not American citizens, and that "Dr. Ament's recent complaint that the powers would do nothing in the way of collecting indemnity for these Christian Chinamen has not tended to raise the estimate of missionary intelligence among diplomats here [Washington D.C.]".

==== Thomas F. Millard ====
Ardent anti-imperialist American war correspondent Thomas Franklin Fairfax Millard (born 1868; died 8 September 1942 in Seattle, Washington), considered "the founding father of American journalism in China" who later "probably has had a greater influence on contemporary newspaper journalism than any other American journalist in China", then a special correspondent for the New York Herald in China since 1900, who also had his reports published in Britain's The Daily Mail, and American magazines including Scribner's Magazine and The Cosmopolitan, and the English-language Kobe Weekly Chronicle of Japan, criticised Ament for his actions on the military expedition to San Ho in September 1900. Millard charged in Scribner's Magazine that the allied insistence on revenge was criminal. "Seized with a vertigo of indiscriminating vengeance, the powers are trifling with the peace of the world. Events such as the months of September, October and November brought to China have carried war back to the Dark Ages, and will leave a taint in the moral atmosphere of the world for a generation to come". Upon his return to the United States in January 1901, in response to a letter urging the editor of The New York Times to retract his editorial of 26 January 1901 on "Loot and Indemnity in China", Millard wrote:

I hope you will not retract your statements. They are well within the facts, as I know from personal observation. It may serve no good purpose to stir this matter up, but how can Christianity reform its mission work as long as it persists in its present hallucinations.

Supporters of Ament attributed Millard's critique to prejudice. For example, ABCFM missionary George D. Wilder in writing to Rev. Judson Smith, secretary of the ABCFM, indicated:

you ask who Mr. Millard is and what reason lies in his prejudice against Missions in general. Mr. Ament does not know him and I have inquired of several missionaries in Peking, none of whom know anything about him. He wrote to the Mail as late as Jan. 12th from Peking. You have probably seen his articles in some of the magazines of America – Scribners or Cosmopolitan. These reporters come through Japan where there is a strong prejudice against Christianity, especially in newspaper circles, and then they stop a few days among the clubs in Shanghai where they are filled with all the yarns about missionaries. I have known of three or four who have admitted that they came north with prejudices against missionaries and that they vanished on acquaintance with our Peking and Tung Chou people. Chamberlain of the Sun was one of these and I think it was he who rebuked another reporter for his tirade against missions by saying "That is the way I felt, too, when I first came but I have changed my mind since I have known the missionaries." We have received copies of a five-column interview with Mr. Ament in the Kobe Herald. He had been terribly slandered by the Kobe Chronicle, whose Editor has announced his purpose to do all the harm to the cause of Christianity that he can, so that we are glad to see an explanation in the same city. We expect Mr. Ament to do much good in setting these things right in the public mind.

One of Millard's protégés, Edgar Snow, described Millard's "anti-colonial, anti-imperialist, pro-independence, pro-equality of nations, pro-Republican, pro-self-determination and very pro-American [views.]."

==== Other Critics ====
John Ames Mitchell wrote sarcastically in his Life magazine that "The Rev. Ament seems to be a good collector. When he gets out of his Chinese scrape he ought to be able to find a place in the Tammany police force.... Mark Twain had hung up the hide of the Reverend Ament, missionary in China." Charles Fletcher Lummis, editor of The Land of Sunshine, agreed with Twain's assessment of the situation: "Dr. Ament, American missionary to China, who extorted from innocent paupers a manifold retribution in blood and money for the sins of the Boxers."

In the eighth series of Ethical Addresses (1901), after referring to "Ament and his pious frauds", Ament's motivations are explored: "It is because the Rev. Mr. Ament loved his church and her temporal possessions more than ... ethical principles.... It is because men love their churches more than righteousness that iniquities done in the name of the church are condoned." In the same publication, however, referring to Ament: "The truth of the matter is, that the missionary has been made the scapegoat by conspiring and corrupt native officials, and by immoral foreigners now in China and their ignorant brethren here in the United States."

The Socialist Party of America supported Twain's attack on Ament and the other missionaries in an editorial in the 29 April 1901 edition of the Daily People by Daniel De Leon:

When, however, Twain ... mercilessly exposed the vandalism of the missionaries in China, when he showed that they had looted the palaces and despoiled the temples, and then sold their booty; he was pounced upon by the whole clergymanic body. He was reviled, he was insulted in a most Christianly way, he was called a liar, a rough, uneducated person, a defamer of good men, a boor, and various other things. Had he treated all the actions of our black coated Huns in China in an abstract way, he could have received forgiveness. It was only when he held the Rev. Ament up as the chief of a band of thieves that he transgressed, and closed forever the wellsprings of mercy.

=== Supporters of Ament ===
The reaction among the missionaries, and proponents of imperialism was swift and predictable. They charged Twain with treason. "Twain's caustic indictment generated, in turn, a defensive apologetics on the part of the American Board of Commissioners for Foreign Missions. Both Judson Smith and Gilbert Reid claimed that missionary looting was "high ethics," and added that American missionaries had only looted to provide money for the relief of Chinese Christians."

==== Judson Smith ====
Rev. Dr. Judson Smith (born 28 June 1837 in Middlefield, Massachusetts; died 29 June 1906 in Roxbury, Massachusetts), who had been one of Ament's professors at Oberlin College, the corresponding secretary of Ament's sponsoring mission (1884–1906), The American Board of Commissioners for Foreign Missions (ABCFM), in letters to both the New York Herald and Tribune in February 1901 denied the accuracy of the Sun clipping of 24 December 1900, indicating that the cable report had "grossly exaggerated" the amount of Mr. Ament's collections. Instead of thirteen times the indemnity it should have read "one and a third times" the indemnity. Further, Smith defended Ament, declaring that Ament had suffered in the Boxer Rebellion and that Twain's "brilliant article would produce an effect quite beyond the reach of plain argument", and that it would do an innocent man an injustice. Smith demanded an apology from Twain. Replying in a letter to the New York Tribune, Twain insisted that Ament had arraigned himself.

==== Gilbert Reid ====
Rev. Gilbert Reid (born 29 November 1857; died 1927) (founder of the Mission among the Higher Classes in China (MHCC)) wrote an article entitled "The Ethics of Loot" in the July edition of Forum, in which he justified the motives and methods of the missionaries in collecting indemnities.

==== North China Mission ====
At the end of January 1901 fourteen members of the North China Mission of the ABCFM endorsed the actions of Ament and Tewksbury: "Voted, That Dr. Ament and Mr. Tewksbury were justified in the following the advice of the United States Minister and selling the moveable property in the Tau-lu-po-fu and the Yu-wang-fu for the benefit of the distressed Chinese refugees and for the extraordinary expenses after the siege was raised...."

==== Peking Missionary Society ====
On 21 March 1901, the Peking Missionary Association demanded Twain retract the statements he made attacking Ament in the February issue of The North American Review "concerning monies he collected from rural Chinese in payment for properties destroyed and people killed during the Boxer rebellion." The PMA secretary cabled the editor of The North American Review: "Peking Missionary Association demands public retraction. Mark Twain's gross libel against Ament utterly false. Secretary."

Twain indicated that he could not comment for publication, but would respond in the April edition of The North American Review. His representative indicated: "He hopes that both the Peking Missionary Association and the American Board of Foreign Missions will like it, but he has his doubts."

==== George D. Wilder ====
George D. Wilder, an ABCFM colleague of Ament in China, wrote in a letter to Judson Smith on 25 March 1901:

Mr. Ament left us this morning after a delay here of five days. The Mark Twain article in the North American Review cut him like a knife and weighs deeply on him, but he takes it in a most beautiful spirit. The sympathy of all the Peking missionaries, and their absolute confidence in his integrity and the uprightness of his course has been a great help to him, and I think he goes back well prepared to set things right so far as he can in person. He plans to write a series of articles telling exactly what he has done. It will be a story worth telling, even if there were no occasion for it as a vindication of his character. I have been with him all this first week since he heard about the Sun and the Review articles. The calm and sweet spirit in which he has taken it and his brave resolution to set the matter right so far as in him lies, is answer enough for those who know of it.

==== Boston Journal ====
Ament was not just defended by his colleagues or other Christian organisations. An editorial in the Boston Journal, entitled "A Humorist Astray", defends Ament:

Mark Twain had better stick to his last. He is a capital humorist but when he poses as a publicist he gets into trouble straightway. His article in the North American Review is not good humor, and is very bad politics. Some of it, moreover, seems to be recklessly and even libellously untrue....

Mr. Ament, against whom Mark aims the hasty shafts of his ridicule and denunciation, is one of the heroic men of peace who distinguished themselves in the defense of the British Legation. He has been a leader in the great and urgent work of relieving the necessities of the native Christians of the northern provinces, or of those who escaped the Boxer sword. In pursuance of this work, he has secured money contributions from the villages where the native Christians suffered. It does not appear that Mr. Ament has used any force to accomplish this. It does not appear that he has secured any more money than was essential to feed and clothe his native wards, and to re-establish them in dwellings. This is a work of Christian charity, defensible on the most elementary grounds of justice. When Mark Twain accuses Dr. Ament and his fellow missionaries of "looting" he manifests a mental and moral obliquity which astonishes and pains his New England neighbors and admirers.

The trouble with our genial humorist is that he is beyond his depth. He would not make a success if he turned statesman. He would not make much of a success if he turned missionary; as a humorist he is incomparable. Every man to his trade. Let Mark remember this, and let him choose as a target for his satire something other than the heroic men who have been through the nightmare of blood and ruin in China, while he has been comfortably basking in the sunlight that makes eternal summer for a genius admired of both old world and new.

==== Henry Stimson ====
Prominent New York lawyer, and future United States Secretary of State, Henry Stimson, responding to a New York Times editorial criticising Ament and the other missionaries in China, wrote in a letter published in The Times on 21 March 1901:

In our time no group of Americans have won no more enduring honor for their country or done the world a greater benefit than have our missionaries in North China. In common decency, is it not time that if at home the full meed of honor cannot not be given them they be at least shielded from deprecating apology and unjust disparagement?

==== Edwin Conger ====
Edwin Hurd Conger (7 March 1843 – 18 May 1907), the United States Minister to China (1898–1905), consistently defended the actions of Ament and the other missionaries. For example, on 25 April 1901, The New York Times reprinted an interview with Conger, originally conducted in Kobe, Japan on 6 April 1901 while both men were en route to the United States. Conger defended the actions of Ament, indicating confiscated goods had been sold to ensure the survival of Chinese Christians. Conger indicated that the missionaries "only appropriated their property for justifiable ends."

On the same day a Boston newspaper reported: "Dr. Ament explains the sale of goods in the Mongol prince's house in which he took up his quarters by saying that those with him were without food and that he sold the goods on the advice of Mr. Conger. Had they not taken possession of the place it would have been destroyed by the Russians. The amount realized by the sale was devoted to the needs of the native Christians." The same despatch quoting from Mr. Conger says:

There were really no actions on the part of the missionaries there that were not entirely justified. There was no government, no organization. There were houses of men who had been firing on the foreign quarter; their property had been abandoned as a result of a state of war, and it was taken in order to succor hundreds of suffering and destitute Chinese whose lives the original owners had been laboring to destroy. Winter was coming on, measures of some kind were imperative, and the appropriation of property for the ends in view was unquestionably justified. I am prepared to justify the conduct of the American missionaries before the siege, during the siege and after the siege.

==== Claude Maxwell MacDonald ====
Colonel Sir Claude Maxwell MacDonald (1852–1915), the chief British diplomat in Beijing during the Boxer Uprising, and the commander of the defence of the besieged foreign legations, also defended the missionaries:

If all looting is wrong, as in theory it is, then they have been to blame: but there are times when the laws of nature assert themselves over the laws of civilization, and this was a case in point. You must remember that these men had just endured a long siege, that they had been bereft of everything they possessed and that they had hundreds of men, similarly destitute, who were dependent upon them. What was their position? Had they come to me and said, 'Give us money and food,' I could only have replied in the negative, or, at all events, to the effect that I could not feed their converts, and so they took the law into their own hands. It has been a case of poetical or primitive justice. But, granted that this sort of justice was admissible, I do not admit that the missionaries abused it. I have not heard of a single instance of a missionary looting for any purpose other than that of feeding themselves and their converts who were dependent on them.

==== Charles Denby ====
Charles Harvey Denby (1830–1904), the United States Minister to China (1885–1898) in his posthumously published China and Her People (1905), supported Ament directly and criticised Twain implicitly: "The raid made on Doctor Ament some years ago is an example of how incautious people, who especially yearn to be funny, handle this subject.... Doctor Ament's conduct was in accordance with Chinese" customs.

=== Newspaper Retractions ===
During the controversy, both The New York Times and the New York Sun issued corrections.

==== The New York Times ====
On 17 February 1901, The New York Times issued a retraction after receiving a different account of Ament's actions from Dr Judson Smith of the ABCFM, based on Ament's letter of 13 November 1900 to Smith. NYT reported that in Ament's own letter he indicated the compensation for the losses of the converts obtained by him had been "by appealing to the sense of justice among the villages where our people had lived." NYT concluded: "It seems that we have been led into doing an injustice to him.... In that case we have to express our sincere regret."

==== New York Sun ====
On 5 March 1901, Wilbur Chamberlin, the journalist who started the controversy, telegraphed to the New York Sun the following, which appeared in that paper under the heading: "A Clean Bill for the Missionaries":

Minister Conger will give a letter to the missionaries here stating that the collection of indemnities was not extortion, but the payment was voluntary on the part of the Chinese officials, and was moderate in amount. The seizure of the property was justified by the prospect that a severe famine was inevitable, and there was no government to look after the distressed people. The proceeds of the seizures were used entirely for these people.

Also in March, the Sun printed an interview with Ament that indicated that the indemnity was not thirteen times the loss, but only one and one-third of the loss. Dr. Porter, Ament's biographer, a fellow missionary in Beijing, considered this an amende honorable.

=== "To My Missionary Critics" (April 1901) ===
Twain apparently "liked the attention he was getting and wrote to a correspondent that he was in "hot water with the clergy and other goody-goody people, but I am enjoying it more than I have ever enjoyed hot water before." In response to an open letter from the ABCFM demanding an apology, Twain penned "To My Missionary Critics", which offered no apologies, although it ended by acknowledging that missionaries no doubt mean well. The essay, originally entitled "The Case of Rev. Dr. Ament, Missionary", was published in the North American Review in April 1901. According to Fitch, "To My Missionary Critics" (1901) recapitulates the charges mounted against Reverend William Ament in "To the Person Sitting in Darkness" and underscores Twain's contempt for the American-Christian missionaries' role in imperialism.

Twain explored the delicate moral difference between a demand thirteen times as great as it should be and a demand that was only one and a third times the correct amount. As Paine explains: "The point had been made by the board that it was the Chinese custom to make the inhabitants of a village responsible for individual crimes; and custom, likewise, to collect a third in excess of the damage, such surplus having been applied to the support of widows and orphans of the slain converts."

Focusing on the exaggerated indemnity, Twain said:

To Dr. Smith the "thirteen-fold-extra" clearly stood for "theft and extortion", and he was right, distinctly right, indisputably right. He manifestly thinks that when it got scaled away down to a mere "one-third" a little thing like that was some other than "theft and extortion". Why, only the board knows! I will try to explain this difficult problem so that the board can get an idea of it. If a pauper owes me a dollar and I catch him unprotected and make him pay me fourteen dollars thirteen of it is "theft and extortion". If I make him pay only one dollar thirty-three and a third cents the thirty-three and a third cents are "theft and extortion", just the same.

In this article, Twain offered some further illustrations, including the "Tale of a King and His Treasure" and another tale entitled "The Watermelons". Twain wrote:

I have it now. Many years ago, when I was studying for the gallows, I had a dear comrade, a youth who was not in my line, but still a scrupulously good fellow though devious. He was preparing to qualify for a place on the board, for there was going to be a vacancy by superannuation in about five years. This was down South, in the slavery days. It was the nature of the negro then, as now, to steal watermelons. They stole three of the melons of an adoptive brother of mine, the only good ones he had. I suspected three of a neighbor's negroes, but there was no proof, and, besides, the watermelons in those negroes' private patches were all green and small and not up to indemnity standard. But in the private patches of three other negroes there was a number of competent melons. I consulted with my comrade, the understudy of the board. He said that if I would approve his arrangements he would arrange. I said, "Consider me the board; I approve; arrange". So he took a gun and went and collected three large melons for my brother-on-the-halfshell, and one over. I was greatly pleased and asked:

"Who gets the extra one?" "Widows and orphans".
"A good idea, too. Why didn't you take thirteen?"
"It would have been wrong; a crime, in fact—theft and extortion".
"What is the one-third extra—the odd melon—the same?"

It caused him to reflect. But there was no result. The justice of the peace was a stern man. On the trial he found fault with the scheme and required us to explain upon what we based our strange conduct—as he called it. The understudy said: "On the custom of the niggers. They all do it".
The justice forgot his dignity and descended to sarcasm. "Custom of the niggers! Are our morals so inadequate that we have to borrow of niggers?"
Then he said to the jury: "Three melons were owing; they were collected from persons not proven to owe them: this is theft; they were collected by compulsion: this is extortion. A melon was added for the widows and orphans. It was owed by no one. It is another theft, another extortion. Return it whence it came, with the others. It is not permissible here to apply to any purpose goods dishonestly obtained; not even to the feeding of widows and orphans, for this would be to put a shame upon charity and dishonor it." He said it in open court, before everybody, and to me it did not seem very kind.

=== Ament's Response ===
When Ament became aware of the criticism of his activities and the subsequent controversy, he was affected adversely. Ament admitted the strain in a letter to his wife on Sunday, 27 January 1901: "I am doing what I do not recall that I ever did before, remaining at home deliberately and missing all the services. I need the rest and felt that it was imperative. You see there is no let up for me. It is a constant strain from morning till night." Missionary colleague Nellie Naomi Russell (born 31 March 1862 in Ontonagon, Michigan; died 22 August 1911 in China) records:

... when he was weary in body and mind, there came like a thunderbolt the article by Mark Twain in the North American Review. I remember that day I went to his study on a matter of business, and found him sitting at his desk as if stricken at the heart. I exclaimed, "What is it? Are you ill?" "If I am what that man says, I am not fit for you to speak to me ! I feel as though I should go off and hide myself in a cave in the mountain, never again to be seen of man." I thought he had gone out of his head with all his cares, and I replied, " What you need is rest and a doctor, and I am going to send for one." If the writer of that article could have seen how he suffered he would have felt that every cent he received for that article would be a red hot coal of fire. A brave, masterful man he was, ever ready to relieve, not to add to the sum of human suffering, and while in some things he may have been unwise, his mistakes, whatever they may have been, were of the head and not the heart.

After Twain's initial article, ABCFM secretary Judson Smith wrote to Agent, and enquired as to the propriety of missionaries collecting indemnity; Ament and Tewksbury both replied that the Chinese themselves preferred this to being subjected to extortionate measures from local officials. Additionally, Ament and Tewksbury indicated that their activities had been approved by the other missionaries. Ament indicated in a letter to his wife on 18 February 1901:

I reviewed my whole work in collecting indemnity and they [Dr. and Mrs. Sheffield] fully approved and are prepared to defend the course taken. The correspondents who have written were all in the dark, and had made no proper inquiries. I have invited correspondents to come and see what was being done, but they did not come. I have been very unjustly treated by these writers, and my friends are coming to the front in defense, as all the missions have done the same things, and all believe they are right. So also does Mr. Conger, who is our good friend. Do not be disturbed by anything you see in the papers. The correspondents jump on to the missionaries when they are out of matter, and news has been very scarce this winter. Dr. Sheffield thinks it better for the work that I return home now than wait a little longer and make my class reunion in 1902.

Ament left Beijing on 26 March 1901 to return to the United States to make his case, clear his name and defend the reputation of the other missionaries. On 1 April 1901, Ament, refusing to be a scapegoat in the affair, cabled the following to the ABCFM: "Nothing has been done except after consultation with colleagues and the full approval of the United States Minister. I will secure a certificate from Mr. [Edwin H.] Conger to that effect."

On 30 March 1901, the New York Tribune, reported Ament's rationale for his actions:

There seemed very little hope of native Christians receiving anything through the instrumentality of their officials, nor did the foreign powers think they were called upon to provide indemnity for these. All the survivors of the churches were reduced to absolute poverty. They were harmless, inoffensive people who had no feuds with their neighbors and had not intruded their religion on any one. This at least was true of the Protestant Christians. If a missionary, by means of his personal influence and by the assistance of the local official who might be friendly to him, could bring the neighbors of his persecuted people to see the error of their ways, and persuade them to contribute money for the rebuilding of destroyed houses and for the support of the survivors of the families, I think he was justified in so doing.

Ament arrived back in the United States on 25 April 1901. On the same day, The New York Times reprinted an interview with Ament, originally conducted in Kobe, Japan on 6 April 1901 while Ament was en route to the United States. In this article, Ament admitted:

the American and English missionaries looted the premises of Prince Yu and other Chinese magnates and sold the plunder for the benefit of the missions, the sale lasting two weeks. After disposing of all the loot, and finding that the demand for sables and other valuable things was undiminished, they purchased other plundered articles from the Russian and East Indian soldiers and sold these at a profit.

Ament only received $75 from the British Loot Committee. Previous to this, a sale of garments and curios was held, and the $400 netted was given to the American Board of Foreign Missions, "with which Dr. Ament is connected. Dr. Ament explained that from the sale of goods plundered from the Mongol Prince's house only $4000 was realized, and this was devoted to the needs of the native Christians."

In May 1901, Ament responded to his critics during a brief visit to the United States of America in 1901 prior to his return to China. In response to the criticisms of Twain and others, Ament denied that the missionaries forced the Chinese to accept Christianity, and that: "We treat their beliefs kindly, try to extract the good, and never interfere with their customs, except where they interfere with Christianity."

In response to Twain's specific allegations, Ament said:

The clan in China is responsible for the individuals and in collecting from the clans we did only what it is the settled policy of the Chinese themselves to do. It would have been impossible to have done otherwise.... As to the "extra" indemnities, we had to provide them for the widows and orphans left penniless and homeless, and who had lost no property to be paid for because they had none. We collected an extra one-third with the consent of the authorities, and distributed it among these people.... It was considered perfectly just and fair by everyone there. Then, too, we had to provide for these people, and so we went to the abandoned grain shops and took what we could find. If we had not done so the Chinese would have. We promised to pay for everything we took. We also sold off all the furniture and goods in the place and used the money to support our Christians. I have been surprised to hear that this was criticised.

On 16 May 1901, Ament addressing guests at the third annual Asiatic Society of America dinner in New York, again defended himself and his fellow missionaries:

The missionaries in China, of whom I am proud to be one, represent a class of American citizens whose work in the Orient have been purposefully misrepresented.... The missionaries' words have been twisted, wrong interpretations made. The persistency of work like this can only justify the feeling that the root of this un-American warfare is due, not so much to what is seen or known of the deeds of missionaries, but the opposition to Christianity itself. The purpose was fixed before China was reached at all, and this murderous spirit stops not at injustice to individuals.

After Ament's death in January 1909, Judson Smith's successor, Dr. James Levi Barton(1855–1936), wrote in an obituary published in The Congregationalist: The cruel and baseless attack made upon him [Ament] in this country by Mark Twain, in 1901, left a deep wound in his heart, in spite of the fact that it was clearly shown that his acts had been above criticism. He said one night, as we were sitting in a Chinese inn upon our way to Shansi, "I presume there are many in the United States who regard me as little better than a thief and a robber." I tried to assure him that no missionary was more honored than he, none more absolutely trusted, as it had been proven that the charges had no foundation in fact. He replied, "That is true, but do the people believe the proof, and will the truth ever catch up with the charge?"

=== Further responses ===
By the end of May 1901, ABCFM board secretary Judson Smith silenced Ament, as he believed further comments were damaging Ament and his colleagues. Smith attempted a final defence of Ament and the other missionaries in May in an essay entitled "The Missionaries and Their Critics".

==== Arthur Henderson Smith ====
"Somewhat at a disadvantage in this exchange, missionary leaders nevertheless attempted to influence opinion in treaty port China; Arthur Smith joined Reid and Judson Smith in writing letters to the North-China Herald justifying missionary actions and criticizing Twain." In a letter to the ABCFM, which was in part published in the 5 May 1901 edition of the New York Times, Arthur Henderson Smith, writing from Beijing, defends Ament:

At the close of the siege Dr. Ament found himself with several hundred Chinese Christians on his hands, homeless, and absolutely dependent on their foreign pastor. With the permission of the Russian military authorities and with the aid of the United States Legation, Mr. Ament took possession of a Mongol house near the former mission premises, and as it was the headquarters for the Boxers who destroyed those premises, it was judged right and proper by all the authority then existing that the contents of this house should be regarded as confiscated and should be sold for the benefit of the Christians, which was done. This is the basis of the oft-repeated charge of 'missionary looting', and it is a total misuse of terms.

Smith, in his China in Convulsion (1901) indicated:

representatives of nine of the important missionary societies in China issued, both in English and in Chinese, a "Statement" in regard to the connection between missionaries and the present crisis. It is of the nature of an explanation, and incidentally a defence, and has attracted favourable comment from the leading foreign journals of Shanghai for its conspicuous fairness and moderation of language. A paragraph from an article in the North China Daily News dealing with should be quoted:

The charge that missionaries have manifested an improper desire to see vengeance done on the perpetrators of last year's outrages is, except in possible isolated cases, as unfounded as Mark Twain's ignorant charges against Dr. Ament and his colleagues in Peking and its vicinity. Men who have examined the whole question with an honest desire to arrive at the truth without prejudice or partiality allow that the behaviour of the missionaries as a body has not only been above reproach, but worthy of praise and gratitude. They have been anxious, as we have all been anxious, to see outrages such as those of last year made impossible in the future, and as long as human nature is what it is, men must be deterred from crime by the conviction that it will be followed by punishment; and not to have punished, and punished severely, the culprits of last year, would have been to invite a repetition of their crimes.

Smith continued:

It is incidentally a gratification to many whose sense of justice has been outraged by the captious criticisms of those with neither knowledge nor candour to comprehend existing conditions, to see that Mr. Conger has not hesitated to take the responsibility for his own advice consistently given to American citizens acting in times of storm and stress. He has comprehensively replied to all the current criticism by the remark: "I am prepared to justify the conduct of the missionaries before the siege, during the siege, and after the siege."

== Assessment of Ament ==
"Twain had considerable popular support, and he did not budge from his positions, but forthrightly defended them in speeches and articles over the next several years." In a letter to his best friend, congregational clergyman Rev. Joseph Twichell, in June 1901, Twain was unrepentant, referring to:

Christian pirates like Ament and professional hypocrites and liars like Rev. Judson Smith of the American Board.... Whenever you ask people to support them [foreign missions] Joe, do bar China. Their presence there is forbidden by the Bible and by every sentiment of humanity – and fair dealing. And they have done vast mischief there. I would bar no other country.

A recent biography portrays Ament in a sympathetic light but concludes that he was:

a brave and resourceful man whose heroism was tarnished by hubris and looting.... William Ament, the most successful missionary in north China, the best evangelist, and the most dedicated pastor had committed a grave error.... That others were no better, and many even worse was no excuse.

== Consequences ==
In October 1901, the Foreign Christian Missionary Society held Mark Twain's attack on Ament responsible for its decrease in income. However, E. E. Strong of Ament's own mission board, the American Board of Commissioners for Foreign Missions, indicated that Twain's attacks actually helped the ABCFM financially:

We answered the charges so superabundantly that I think they affected very few of our givers.... Of course, they made a difference with some who had no inclination to look into the matter. On the other hand, they helped us financially.

== Sources and further reading ==
=== Articles ===
==== Contemporaneous (1877–1910) ====
- American Asiatic Association. Journal of the American Asiatic Association 2 (1901–1902):10. John Foord, 1901.
- American Home Missionary Association, and Congregational Home Missionary Society. The Home Missionary 74–76 (1901–1903):7. Executive Committee of the American Home Missionary Society, 1902.
- American Missionary Association, and Congregational Home Missionary Society. The American Missionary (1901):198.
- Barton, James L. "An Appreciation of Dr. Ament". Missionary Herald (February 1909).
- Bellamy, Francis Rufus. Article in New Outlook. Outlook Publishing Company, Inc., 1901. See pages 377–388 for Ament.
- Brotherhood of Locomotive Firemen (U.S.). Locomotive Firemen's Magazine. Vol. 31. Brotherhood of Locomotive Fireman, 1901. Page 292.
- Chautauqua Institution. The Chautauquan 34 (1902):13. Chautauqua Literary and Scientific Circle, 1902.
- Conant, William Cowper, ed. "Justice to the Missionaries in China." Salvation: A New Evangelical Monthly 3 (1901):205.
- De Leon, Daniel. "Mark Twain on Missionaries." Daily People 1:303 (29 April 1901):1. online: .
- Episcopal Church Board of Missions. The Spirit of Missions 73 (1908):630. Episcopal Church Domestic and Foreign Missionary Society. J.L. Powell, 1908.
- Fenn, Courtenay H. "In the Matter of Loot". The Presbyterian Banner. 11 April 1901.
- Fibre & Fabric: A Record of American Textile Industries in the Cotton and Woolen Trade 33 (1901). Details arrest of Ament.
- General Convention of the Christian Church. Herald of Gospel Liberty 112:1–26 (1920):515. Christian Pub. Association, 1920.
- "The Giant Awakened", Gleanings in Bee Culture 37 (1909):23ff. Published by A. I. Root Co., 1909. Article on Ament with reference to his pastorate in Medina, Ohio.
- Gilman, Daniel Coit; Harry Thurston Peck; and Frank Moore Colby. "William Scott Ament", 435. In The New International Encyclopaedia. Dodd, Mead and Company, 1902.
- Hubbard, Elbert, ed. The Philistine: A Periodical of Protest. 14 (December 1901 – May 1902):88. Society of the Philistines (East Aurora, N.Y.).
- Literary Digest 23:2 (1901):36–37.
- Methodist Magazine and Review. Vol. 55 (January to June 1902). W. Briggs, 1902. See pages 377–378.
- Mind 9 (1901–1902):100. Discusses Reid's Ethics of Loot.
- Mitchell, John Ames, ed. Life. Vol. 37 (1901). Page 298.
- Post, Louis Freeland; Alice Thatcher Post; and Stoughton Cooley. The Public. Vol. 3. Louis F. Post, 1900. Page 724.
- Reid, Gilbert. "The Ethics of the Last War," Forum 32 (1902):446–55.
- Reid, Gilbert. "The Ethics of Loot," Forum 31:5 (July 1901):581–86.
- Reid, Gilbert. North-China Herald, (27 March 1901):602–3.
- Shaw, Albert. The American Monthly Review of Reviews 23 (1901):748.
- Smith, Arthur Henderson. North-China Herald (19 June 1901):1193–94.
- Smith, Judson. "The Missionaries and their Critics," North American Review 172 (May 1901):724–733.
- Smith, Judson. North-China Herald (3 April 1901):660–61.
- Smylie, James H. (January 2001). "The Preacher: Mark Twain and Slaying Christians". Theology Today. Archived from the original on 17 January 2009 – via FindArticles.
- Society for the Propagation of the Gospel in Foreign Parts (Great Britain). The East and the West. 6 (1908):146. Society for the Propagation of the Gospel in Foreign Parts., 1908.
- Twain, Mark. "To My Missionary Critics". The North American Review 172 (April 1901):520. On-line:
- Twain, Mark. "To the Person Sitting in Darkness". The North American Review 172 (February 1901):161. On-line:
- United Free Church of Scotland Women's Foreign Mission. The Women's Missionary Magazine of the United Free Church of Scotland No. 1-24 (1901–1902): 43. Publications Office [United Free Church], 1901.
- United States War Dept. Report of the Lieutenant-General Commanding the Army, in Seven Parts: Military Operations in China. 1900. See page 138 for reference to Ament.
- University of Chicago. The University Record. Vol. 6. University of Chicago, 1901. Page 335.
- Wilder, G. D. "Wm. Scott Ament," Chinese Recorder (May 1909):276–81.

==== Recent ====
- 李佳白与尚贤堂—清末民初在华传教士活动个案研究 ["Gilbert Reid and the International Institute of China: A Case Study of Foreign Missionary Activities in Late Qing and Early Republic China".] Journal of Historical Science (September 2005). ISSN 0583-0214(2005)09-0057-06.
- Gibson, William M. "Mark Twain and Howells: Anti-Imperialists." The New England Quarterly (December 1947): 435ff.
- Hevia, James L. "Leaving a Brand on China: Missionary Discourse in the Wake of the Boxer Movement," Modern China 18:3 (July 1992).
- Hevia, James L. "Looting Beijing, 1860, 1900", 192–213, in Tokens of Exchange: The Problem of Translation in Global Circulations. Edited by Lydia He Liu. Duke University Press, 1999.
- Hevia, James L. "Loot's Fate: The Economy of Plunder and the Moral Life of Objects from the Summer Palace of the Emperor of China." History and Anthropology, 6:4 (1994):319–345.
- Hunt, Michael H. "The Forgotten Occupation: Peking, 1900–1901." The Pacific Historical Review 48:4 (November 1979):501–529.
- Kinch, J. C. B. "Europe and Elsewhere", in The Mark Twain Encyclopedia. Page 261.
- King, H. H. "The Boxer Indemnity: 'Nothing but Bad'" Modern Asian Studies 40:3 (2006):663–689.
- Maier-Katkin, Birgit and Daniel Maier-Katkin. "At the Heart of Darkness: Crimes Against Humanity and the Banality of Evil". Human Rights Quarterly 26:3 (August 2004):584–604.
- Newman, Rhoda. "Mark Twain, Internationalist: Travel writer and diplomat wannabe waxes satirically on envoys, imperialism." Foreign Service Journal (February 1996):18–23; http://www.twainweb.net/filelist/intl01.html.
- Scully, Eileen P. "Taking the Low Road to Sino-American Relations: "Open Door" Expansionists and the Two China Markets". The Journal of American History 82:1 (June 1995):62–83. Discusses Reid's "Ethics of Looting".
- Titta, R. "Mark Twain and the Onset of the Imperialist Period." The Internationalist (September–October 1997).
- Tsou Mingteh. "Christian Missionary as Confucian Intellectual: Gilbert Reid (1857–1927) and the Reform Movement in the Late Qing", 73–90. In Christianity in China, ed. Daniel H. Bays. Stanford University Press, 1999.

=== Books ===
==== Contemporaneous (1877–1950) ====
- Allen, Roland. The Siege of the Peking Legations: Being the Diary of the Rev. Roland Allen ... With Maps and Plans. Smith, Elder, 1901. Page 23.
- American Council of Learned Societies Devoted to Humanistic Studies, Dictionary of American Biography. Volume 1. New York: Charles Scribner's Sons, 1964. See page 241 for article on Ament.
- Barton, James L. The Missionary and His Critics. New York, NY: Fleming H. Revell Company, 1906.
- Beach, Harlan Page. A Geography and Atlas of Protestant Missions: Their Environment, Forces, Distribution, Methods, Problems, Results and Prospects at the Opening of the Twentieth Century. Vol. 1. Student Volunteer Movement for Foreign Missions, 1901. Page 290.
- Carus, Paul. The Open Court: Devoted to the Science of Religion, the Religion of Science, and the Extension of the Religious Parliament Idea. The Open Court Pub. Co., 1901. Page 329.
- Chamberlin, Georgia Louise, ed. Ordered to China: Letters of Wilbur J. Chamberlin Written from China While Under Commission from the New York Sun During the Boxer Uprising of 1900 and the International Complications which Followed. F. A. Stokes company, 1903. Chamberlin sent the initial despatch that fueled the Indemnity Controversy between Twain and Ament.
- Clark, Francis Edward. Memories of Many Men in Many Lands: An Autobiography. United Society of Christian Endeavor, 1922.
- Coleman, George William. Searchlights. Arakelyan Press, 1909. Page 85.
- Conger, Sarah Pike. Letters from China: With Particular Reference to the Empress Dowager and the Women of China. A.C. McClurg & Co., 1910.
- Cromer, Jeremiah C. "William S Ament: An Ideal Missionary". Pamphlet, Envelope Series 12, no. 2 (July 1909).
- Denby, Charles. China and Her People: Being the Observations, Reminiscences, and Conclusions of an American Diplomat. L.C. Page & company, 1905. Denby defends Ament's role in collecting indemnities after the Boxer Uprising. See pages 217–218.
- Dickinson, Goldsworthy Lowes. The International Anarchy, 1904–1914. 1926.
- Dickinson, Goldsworthy Lowes. Letters from John Chinaman and Other Essays. 1901.
- Fullerton, William Young and Charles Edward Wilson. New China: A Story of Modern Travel. Morgan and Scott, 1932. Page 129.
- Gamewell, Mary Porter and Alexander Harrison Tuttle. Mary Porter Gamewell and Her Story of the Siege in Peking. Eaton & Mains, 1907.
- Griffis, William Elliot. China's Story: In Myth, Legend, And Annals. Rev. ed. Boston and New York: Houghton Mifflin, 1935.
- Harrison, Frederic. "The Religion of Duty", in Ethical Addresses. Vol. 8. American Ethical Union. S. Burns Weston, 1901. Pages 35, 92–93.
- Ketler, Isaac Conrad. The Tragedy of Paotingfu: An Authentic Story of the Lives, Services and Sacrifices of the Presbyterian, Congregational and China Inland Missionaries who Suffered Martyrdom at Paotingfu, China, 30 June and 1 July 1900. Revell, 1902.
- Latourette, Kenneth Scott. A History of Christian Missions in China. The Macmillan company, 1929.
- Lobenstein, Edwin Carlyle et al., eds. The China Christian Year Book. Kwang Hsüeh, 1910. Page viii.
- Lumis, Charles Fletcher. The Land of Sunshine. Vol. 14. F.A. Pattee, 1901. Page 237.
- McIntosh, Gilbert. Is There Anything in It?: Some After-crisis Vindications. Morgan & Scott, 1902. Pages 48–56.
- Mateer, Ada Haven. Siege Days: Personal Experiences of American Women and Children During the Peking Siege. Fleming H. Revell, 1903.
- Mather, Amasa Stone. Extracts from the Letters, Diary and Note Books of Amasa Stone Mather: June 1907 to December 1908. Vol. 2. Privately printed by the Arthur H. Clark Co., 1910. See page 40.
- Memoriam William Scott Ament, 1851–1909: Memorial Addresses, Tungchou, 1909, 47pp.
- Miner, Luella. China's Book of Martyrs: A Record of Heroic Martyrdoms and Marvelous Deliverances of Chinese Christians During the Summer of 1900. Jennings and Pye, 1903. Pages 79, 243.
- Morrison, George Ernest. The Correspondence of G.E. Morrison. Vol. 1: 1895–1912. Ed., Hui-min Lo. CUP Archive, 1976.
- National Council of the Congregational Churches in the United States. Addresses, Reports, Statements of Benevolent Societies, Constitution, Minutes, Roll of Delegates, Etc. Vol. 12. Congregational Churches in the United States National Council, 1904. Page 209.
- Oberlin College. "Annual Reports". (September 1908 – October 1909):384–385.
- Paine, Albert Bigelow. Mark Twain: A Biography: The Personal and Literary Life of Samuel Langhorne Clemens. "Mark Twain and the Missionaries." Chapter CCXIV.
- Porter, Henry Dwight. William Scott Ament: Missionary of the American Board to China. Revell, 1911. On-line:
- Roberts, James Hudson. A Flight for Life and an Inside View of Mongolia. The Pilgrim press, 1903. Page 31.
- Rose, Martha Emily Parmelee. The Western Reserve of Ohio and Some of Its Pioneers, Places and Women's Clubs, National American Woman Suffrage Association Collection. Euclid Print. Co., 1914. See page 133.
- Rowe, Henry Kalloch. History of Andover Theological Seminary. n.p., 1933. Ament is described as a distinguished alumnus.
- Russell, Nellie Naomi. Gleanings from Chinese Folklore: With some of her stories of life in China, to which are added memorial sketches of the author from associates and friends.. Comp. Mary Harriet Porter. Chicago: Fleming H. Revell, 1915. Page 34.
- Shaw, William. The Evolution of an Endeavorer: An Autobiography. Boston: Christian Endeavor World, 1924. See pages 227–228, 319–320.
- Smith, Stanley Peregrine . China from Within: Or, The Story of the Chinese Crisis. Marshall Bros., 1901.
- Twain, Mark. Mark Twain: Collected Tales, Sketches, Speeches, and Essays: Volume 2: 1891–1910. Library of America, 1992.
- William Scott Ament: Addresses Given at the Memorial Services Held at Teng Shih K'ou Congregational Church, Peking, China, Sunday, February Fourteenth, Nineteen Hundred Nine. North China Union College Press, 1909.
- Wolferstan, Bertram. The Catholic Church in China from 1860 to 1907. Sands & Co., 1909. See pages 35–36.

==== Recent ====
- Austin, Alvyn. China's Millions: The China Inland Mission and Late Qing Society, 1832–1905. Wm. B. Eerdmans Publishing, 2007.
- Barlow, Tani E. Formations of Colonial Modernity in East Asia. Duke University, 1997. Page 126.
- Bickers, Robert A. and R. G. Tiedemann. The Boxers, China, and the World. Rowman & Littlefield, 2007. ISBN 0-7425-5395-7, ISBN 978-0-7425-5395-8.
- Chamberlain, E. Russell. Loot!: The Heritage of Plunder. New York: Facts on File, 1983.
- Chʼên, Jerome. China and the West: Society and Culture, 1815–1937. Indiana University Press, 1979. Discusses ethics of looting.
- Cohen, Paul A. History in Three Keys: The Boxers as Event, Experience, and Myth. Columbia University Press, 1997.
- Deane, Hugh. Good Deeds & Gunboats: Two Centuries of American-Chinese Encounters. China Books & Periodicals, 1990. See page 66 for the Ament-Twain controversy.
- Edwards, Dwight Woodbridge. Yenching University. United Board for Christian Higher Education in Asia, 1959. Pages 13, 34.
- Elliott, Jane E. Some Did it for Civilisation, Some Did it for Their Country: A Revised View of the Boxer War. Chinese University Press, 2002.
- Emerson, Everett H. Mark Twain: A Literary Life. University of Pennsylvania Press, 2000. Page 257.
- Esherick, Joseph W. The Origins of the Boxer Uprising. University of California Press, 1988. Page 310 for missionary looting.
- Ewing, Charles Edward; and Bessie Smith Ewing. Death Throes of a Dynasty: Letters and Diaries of Charles and Bessie Ewing, Missionaries to China. Ed. E. G. Ruoff. Kent State University Press, 1990.
- Falkenstine, Mike. The Chinese Puzzle: Putting the Pieces Together for a Deeper Understanding of China and Her Church. Xulon Press, 2008. See page 29 for references to missionary looting defended.
- Foner, Philip Sheldon. Mark Twain: Social Critic. International Publishers, 1958. See page 280.
- Geismar, Maxwell David. Mark Twain: An American Prophet. Houghton Mifflin, 1970. See 207–209 for analysis of Twain's attack on Ament.
- Greene, Felix. A Curtain of Ignorance: How the American Public Has Been Misinformed about China. Doubleday, 1964.
- Greenlee, James Grant and Charles Murray Johnston. Good Citizens: British Missionaries and Imperial States, 1870–1918. McGill-Queen's Press – MQUP, 1999. See pages 110–114 especially for missionaries as "good citizens" and indemnities.
- [Gu, Changsheng] [顾长声]. 从马礼逊到司徒雷登—来华新教传教士评传 [From Morrison to Stuart: Critical Reviews on Protestant Missionaries in China. 上海人民出版社 [Shanghai: Shanghai Renmin Chubanshe], 1985. Includes Ament.
- Harris, Susan K. "Mark Twain and America's Christian Mission Abroad", In A Companion to Mark Twain, eds. Peter Messent and Louis J. Budd. Blackwell, 2005. ISBN 978-1-4051-2379-2.
- Hevia, James L. English Lessons: The Pedagogy of Imperialism in Nineteenth-Century China. Duke University, 2003. See page 218 for account of Ament exacting indemnity in September 1900 and sanctioned "looting of several homes of the village".
- Hunter, Jane. The Gospel of Gentility: American Women Missionaries in Turn-of-the-Century China. Yale University Press, 1984.
- Laurence, Patricia Ondek, trans. Lily Briscoe's Chinese Eyes: Bloomsbury, Modernism, and China. University of South Carolina Press, 2003.
- Lodwick, Kathleen, ed. The "Chinese Recorder" Index: A Guide to Christian Missions in Asia, 1867–1941. Rowman & Littlefield, 1986. See index on page 7 for extensive list of articles by both William & Mary Ament.
- Lutz, Jesse Gregory. China and the Christian Colleges, 1850–1950. Cornell University Press, 1971.
- Martin, William Alexander Parsons. The Siege in Peking, China Against the World: By an Eye Witness. Adamant Media, 2002. See page 136 for reference to Ament.
- Miller, Stuart Creighton. "Ends and Means: Missionary Justification of Force in Nineteenth Century China," The Missionary Enterprise in China and America, ed. J.K. Fairbank (Cambridge, MA: Harvard University Press, 1974):249–282.
- Oggel, L. Terry. "American Board of Foreign Missions", p. 23. In The Mark Twain Encyclopedia, edited by J. R. LeMaster; James Darrell Wilson; and Christie Graves Hamric. Taylor & Francis, .
- Olson, James Stuart; Robert Shadle; Ross Marlay; William Ratliff; and Joseph M. Rowe, eds. Historical Dictionary of European Imperialism. Greenwood Publishing Group, 1991. Pages 73–74 for Boxer Rebellion, 128–130 for "China".
- Phipps, William E. Mark Twain's Religion. Mercer University Press, 2003.
- Preston, Diana. Besieged in Peking: The Story of the 1900 Boxer Rising. Constable, 1999. Page 69.
- Preston, Diana. The Boxer Rebellion: The Dramatic Story of China's War on Foreigners that Shook the World in the Summer of 1900. Walker, 2000; See page 395. Berkley Books, 2001. See page 291 for a description of missionary "looting".
- Reinders, Eric Robert. Borrowed Gods and Foreign Bodies: Christian Missionaries Imagine Chinese Religion. University of California Press, 2004.
- Scully, Eileen P. Bargaining with the State from Afar: American Citizenship in Treaty Port China, 1844–1942. Columbia University Press, 2001. Discusses Reid's "The Ethics of Looting".
- Shavit, David. The United States in Asia: A Historical Dictionary. Greenwood, 1990. See pages 6–7 for an article on Ament.
- Strong, William Ellsworth. The Story of the American Board: An Account of the First Hundred Years of the American Board for Foreign Missions. Arno Press, 1969.
- Thompson, Larry Clinton. William Scott Ament and the Boxer Rebellion: Heroism, Hubris and the Ideal Missionary. McFarland & Company, March 2009.
- Varg, Paul A. Missionaries, Chinese, and Diplomats: The American Protestant Missionary Movement in China, 1890–1952. Princeton University Press, 1958. See page 49, n.35 for discussion of Twain & Ament.
- Young, Marilyn Blatt. The Rhetoric of Empire: American China Policy, 1895–1901. Harvard University Press, 1969.
- Zwick, Jim. Confronting Imperialism: Essays on Mark Twain and the Anti-Imperialist League. Infinity Publishing, November 2007.
- Zwick, Jim, ed. Mark Twain's Weapons of Satire: Anti-Imperialist Writings on the Philippine-American War. Syracuse University Press, 1992.

=== Audiobooks ===
- To My Missionary Critics public domain audiobook at LibriVox

=== Dissertations and Theses ===
- Wong, Lai Hang. "Protestant Missionary Concepts of and Revolutions in China, 1895–1911." A Dissertation. Presented to the Faculty of Arts in partial fulfillment of the requirements for the Master of Arts, University of Hong Kong, 1976.
