= William Scott Ament =

Christian missionary to China (1851–1909)

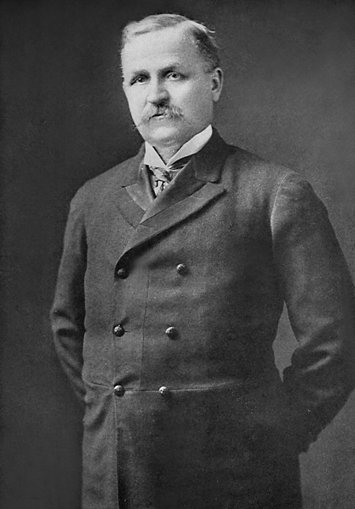
William Scott Ament, ca. 1905

William Scott Ament (Chinese Names: 梅子明 and 梅威良 Mei Wei Liang; 14 September 1851 – 6 January 1909 in San Francisco) was a missionary to China for the American Board of Commissioners for Foreign Missions (ABCFM) from 1877, and was known as the "Father of Christian Endeavor in China." Ament became prominent as a result of his activism during the Boxer Uprising and controversial in its aftermath because of the personal attacks on him by American writer Mark Twain for his collection of punitive indemnities from northern Chinese villages.

== Biographical details ==
William Scott Ament was born of Dutch and French Huguenot ancestry on 14 September 1851 in Owosso, Michigan, the eldest son of Winfield Scott Ament (c. 1811 – 1865), an ironworker, and Emily Hammond Ament (born 3 May 1818; married 4 September 1848; died April 1908 in Oberlin, Ohio), and the younger brother of Claribel Ament Leggat (born c. 1850 in Owosso, Michigan; died 1881 in Butte, Montana).

=== Spiritual background ===
At the age of twelve, Will Ament became a member of the Congregational church (now the Owosso First Congregational Church United Church of Christ) at Owosso, Michigan, which had been organised on 18 January 1853. About the time of his father's death, when he was 14, Ament had a deeper spiritual experience as a result of a religious revival in his home church. While studying at Oberlin Academy, Ament underwent "a new and deep spiritual impulse" and transferred his church membership to the Second Congregational Church at Oberlin, Ohio. According to Porter, "From that time on he was hearty, aggressive and fearless in meeting those who opposed Christianity, and made the service of Christ the chief thing of life."

=== Education ===
Ament attended the Owosso High School, and upon graduation enrolled in the Oberlin Academy in Oberlin, Ohio, a preparatory school, in the fall of 1867. Two years later he enrolled at Oberlin College. Ament was "the second boy to go from here [Owosso] to college and the first to graduate." While at Oberlin College, Ament was influenced by the example of Oberlin's recently retired president, revivalist Charles Grandison Finney. Ament had to work his way through college. While studying at Oberlin College, Ament became the supervisor (principal) of the Richfield Central high school at Richfield, Ohio (since the early 1950s, Revere High School).

After graduation from Oberlin College in 1873, Ament attended the Union Theological Seminary in Manhattan, New York for three years from 1873. While at Union Seminary, Ament taught at nights, and later was a tutor to the son of a rich man. On Sundays, he taught a class of boys in the mission school on the corner of Elizabeth and Broome Streets. In 1876 Ament transferred to Andover Theological Seminary, where he graduated in the early summer of 1877 with a Bachelor of Divinity (B.D.) degree.

=== Call to missionary service ===
As Ament's education advanced, his heart settled itself upon China as his field of service. While studying at Andover, Ament formally applied to the ABCFM for appointment to foreign missionary service under their auspices on 4 November 1876.

=== Marriage and ordination (1877) ===
On 23 August 1877, Ament married Mary Alice Penfield (born 4 July 1856 in Oberlin, Ohio; died April 1928 in Columbus, Ohio), an 1875 Bachelor of Arts graduate in literature of Oberlin College, and the daughter of Professor Charles Henry Penfield (born 7 January 1826 at Alden, New York; died 11 May 1891 at Cleveland, Ohio), who had taught Greek and Latin at Oberlin College (1846–1870), and his first wife, Margaret Gertrude Wyett (born 14 December 1824 in London, England; married 25 April 1850; died 15 April 1861 at Oberlin, Ohio);

Ament was ordained as a missionary in the Owosso Congregational church on 5 September 1877 under the direction of pastor Rev. Lucius O. Lee, who eventually resigned in 1880 to go to Turkey, and who later became President of the Central Turkey Theological Seminary at Maraş, Turkey.

== Ministry (1877–1909) ==
=== First missionary term in China (1877–1885) ===
The Aments departed for China from Oakland, California on 17 October 1877 on the steamer China. After an eleven-week journey, they eventually arrived in Peking (now Beijing), China.

==== Paotingfu (1878–1880) ====
Ament served as a Congregational missionary at the North China Mission in Paotingfu (now Baoding), the then capital of Zhili province, China, (about 137 kilometres south of Beijing) from 1877 to 1880. At that time there were about 100,000 residents, of whom 22,000 were beggars. Severe famine in the region resulted in their focus on famine relief.

While serving in Paotingfu, the Aments had their first child, Margaret (born November 1879), who died just after her birth.

==== Peking (1880–1885) ====
Due to Mary's continued illness, the Aments transferred to Beijing in 1880, where they served until late 1885. Additionally, Ament was the editor of the North China News, and The North China Church Times.

During their first term in Beijing, the Aments had another two children: Philip Wyett Ament (born 21 October 1882; died 27 June 1883 in Beijing); and Emily Hammond Ament (born 24 August 1884 in China).

===== Christian Endeavour Unions of China =====
Ament became one of the founders and president of The Young People's Society of Christian Endeavour, known as the Christian Endeavour Unions of China (CEC). Ament believed passionately in the importance of Christian Endeavour: "Without doubt Christian Endeavor will have a large share in bringing the new life to awakened China." In 1900 Ament was elected President of the North China Christian Endeavor Union.

=== First furlough: ministry in Ohio (1885–1888) ===
Due to the severe illness of Ament's mother, Emily Hammond Ament, Ament accepted the call to pastor a 250 member Congregational church in Medina, Ohio (about 30 kilometres from Cleveland, Ohio) so that he could care for her. During his three years there, he built up a strong church. While in Ohio, Ament became the president of the Ohio Christian Endeavor Union,

In 1887 the Aments had their fourth (and final) child, William Sheffield Ament (born 25 July 1887 in Medina, Ohio; died 1951), their only child to survive childhood. Will, Jr. would become a professor of English at Scripps College, Claremont, California, and the co-author of Oxcart to Airplane (Powell, 1929), "the only general history of California transportation."

=== Second missionary term in China (1888–1897) ===
In August 1888, Ament and his family returned to Beijing to resume their missionary duties.

==== Death of Emily Ament ====
At 9.30 am on Monday, 27 February 1893, the Aments' daughter, Emily died in Beijing of diphtheria at the age of eight and a half. after a week's illness. Funds were donated to establish on Fifth Street, Beijing, near the Congregational Church's North Chapel, the Emily Ament Memorial School for the education of Chinese girls. By late 1899, the school was re-located to Sixth Street.

==== Editor North China News ====
During 1893 Ament became the editor of the North China News, a Chinese monthly newspaper, with an initial circulation in excess of 550 copies per month.

Among Ament's other duties were being the ABCFM mission treasurer; postmaster for both the ABCFM and Presbyterian Mission; manager of the mission book room; manager of the Bible book store; and pastoral care of three congregations. In addition, he continued to serve as an evangelist. From October 1894, Ament became superintendent of the boys' school, as well as the preacher at the Beijing South Chapel.

In 1896, Ament presented a paper entitled "The Spiritual Needs of Native Christians", in which he decried mere numerical addition of church members, indicating that "The one thing to be arrived at is a spiritual Church in China."

=== Second furlough (1897–1898) ===
From spring 1897 Ament spent part of the year on furlough in Owosso, Michigan and was active in his home church, the Owosso First Congregational Church, and was responsible for re-invigorating the missionary focus of that church. During summer 1897 he preached daily at the Owosso Y.M.C.A.

=== Third missionary term in China (1898–1901) ===
On 4 September 1898, Ament left his wife and son, Willie, in Owosso to care for his mother, and his deceased sister's daughter. Ament returned to Beijing on 8 October 1898, to confront increased anti-foreign opposition as a consequence of the overthrow of the Chinese emperor in a coup d'état.

In 1898, Ament had a paper "The Religions of China" published in The Student Missionary Appeal: Addresses at the Third International Convention of the Student Volunteer Movement for Foreign Missions, in which he indicated: "Some one has said that you cannot tell the truth about the Chinese without lying. They are the most irreligious people on the face of the earth."

In December 1898, Ament was notified that Oberlin College, his alma mater, had decided to award him an honorary Doctor of Divinity (D.D.) degree.

By the end of 1900, Ament had been responsible for planting 17 of the 22 churches associated with the Peking branch of the China ABCFM mission.

==== The Boxer Uprising and its aftermath (1900) ====
Ament was captured by Boxers while on an expedition with another missionary about 100 kilometres from Beijing, however was able to escape unharmed. During the Boxer Uprising of 1900, on Thursday 7 June 1900, Ament requested a military escort from Edwin H. Conger, the United States Minister to China, to allow the evacuation of the besieged ABCFM missionaries in Tungchow (now the Tongzhou District of Beijing) (located 21 kilometres south-east of Beijing). As Conger refused to provide the escort as he believed he needed all his troops in Beijing, Ament himself travelled alone and unarmed to Tungchow by train with 16 carts, and facilitated the successful evacuation of 24 members of the missionary community and a number of Chinese helpers. The Tungchow missionaries "succeeded in getting up to Peking, with their wives and families, on 8 June, thanks to the pluck and energy of Mr. Ament".

During the subsequent attack on the Methodist missionary compound by the Boxers in Beijing, Ament was reportedly the last missionary to leave the compound on the afternoon of Wednesday, 13 June 1900. A week after the evacuation of the Methodist compound, Ament, despite increased Boxer activity, returned to the Methodist compound to assess the possibility of retrieving goods left behind after their evacuation. Ament then organised twenty other missionaries and 60 Chinese to return to the compound to remove as many stores as possible which contributed greatly to their preservation during the siege. "This aid to which so many were indebted was the result of Mr. Ament's investigation." During the subsequent fifty-five-day siege, Ament sheltered in the British Legation in the Beijing Legation Quarter, where he had responsibility for looking after confiscated goods.

While Ament through his own personal initiative was able to rescue the ABCFM missionaries at Tungchow, there was still significant loss of lives. Thirteen ABCFM adult missionaries and five children were killed by the Boxers. Included were Miss Mary Susan Morrill (born 1863 in Portland, Maine) and Miss Annie Allender Gould, among the eleven foreign missionaries, four children, and about fifty Chinese Christians killed in Baoding from 30 June 1900. Additionally, there was much damage to ABCFM property. The ABCFM Mission compound was razed, as was the Emily Ament Memorial School (named in honour of Ament's daughter) on Sixth Street, Peking. Ament estimated that by the end of July 1900 that losses for the ABCFM Peking station was about $71,000 gold.

From 13 September 1900, Ament, and an assistant, Reverend Elwood Gardner Tewksbury (born 1865, West Newbury, Massachusetts), accompanied by the U.S. 6th Cavalry, searched the areas adjacent to Beijing for Boxers, collecting indemnities for Christians who had been killed by the Boxers, and ordering the burning of some homes and even executing suspected Boxers. Ament had been chosen "as the one who would be honorable and just to all."

==== Indemnities controversy (1901) ====
In 1901 Ament became embroiled in a controversy regarding his activities (and those of other Christian missionaries, including the Roman Catholic Pierre-Marie-Alphonse Favier) subsequent to the Boxer Rebellion. "In the war's aftermath came a war of words. Missionary triumphalism clashed with the sarcastic sallies of Mark Twain, who lampooned the apologias for looting given by American missionary William Scott Ament." An interview that Wilbur Chamberlin of the New York Sun conducted with Ament elevated the missionary question into a cause célèbre.

===== Mark Twain's critique =====
Mark Twain, was "an outspoken critic of American involvement in the Philippines and China", and "one of the mammoth figures in anti-imperialism, and certainly the foremost anti-imperialist literary figure". Twain decided to use the Sun article as the basis of a sustained attack on both the missionary enterprise and its imperialist tendencies. According to Foner, Twain used the conduct of Ament to "drive home the point that the missionary movement served as a front for imperialism. Twain especially targeted Ament in this article. According to Susan Harris:“To the Person Sitting in Darkness,” which Mark Twain published in the North American Review in 1901, attacks Western imperialism as it was manifesting itself in South Africa, China, Cuba, and the Philippines. It names its villains – [William] McKinley, Joseph Chamberlain, the Kaiser, the Czar – and their instruments, especially the Reverend William Ament, a Congregationalist minister who was affiliated with the American Board of Commissioners for Foreign Missions.

After the publication of "To the Person Sitting in Darkness" in The North American Review for February 1901, as the opening article, there was a huge controversy. This article "created a national sensation as well as a savage debate between Twain and the American Board of Foreign Missions."

Ament was subsequently attacked in The New York Times;, by John Ames Mitchell, the editor of Life magazine; by Charles Fletcher Lummis, editor of The Land of Sunshine; and by The Socialist Party of America. Ament was further attacked in the Eighth series of Ethical Addresses (1901).

Ament was defended both by missionaries and the proponents of imperialism. Their reaction was swift and predictable. They charged Twain with treason. "Twain's caustic indictment generated, in turn, a defensive apologetics on the part of the American Board of Commissioners for Foreign Missions. Both Judson Smith (born 28 June 1837 in Middlefield, Massachusetts; died 29 June 1906 in Roxbury, Massachusetts), who had been one of Ament's professors at Oberlin College, the corresponding secretary of Ament's sponsoring mission (1884–1906), The American Board of Commissioners for Foreign Missions (ABCFM); and Gilbert Reid (independent missionary, formerly a member of the American Presbyterian mission) claimed that missionary looting was "high ethics," and added that American missionaries had only looted to provide money for the relief of Chinese Christians." Smith demanded an apology from Twain. Replying in a letter to the New York Tribune, Twain insisted that Ament had arraigned himself.

At the end of January 1901 fourteen members of the North China Mission of the ABCFM endorsed the actions of Ament and Tewksbury. On 21 March 1901, the Peking Missionary Association demanded Twain retract the statements he made attacking Ament. After Ament's death in January 1909, Judson Smith's successor, Dr. James Levi Barton (1855–1936) also defended him and his actions.

Ament was not just defended by his colleagues or other Christian organisations. He was defended in an editorial in the Boston Journal;, by prominent New York lawyer, and future United States Secretary of State, Henry Stimson; by Edwin Hurd Conger (7 March 1843 – 18 May 1907), the United States Minister to China (1898–1905); by Colonel Sir Claude Maxwell MacDonald (1852–1915), the chief British diplomat in Beijing during the Boxer Uprising, and the commander of the defence of the besieged foreign legations; and by Charles Harvey Denby (1830–1904), the former United States Minister to China (1885–1898).

When Ament became aware of the criticism of his activities and the subsequent controversy, he was affected adversely. Ament admitted the strain in a letter to his wife on Sunday, 27 January 1901: "I am doing what I do not recall that I ever did before, remaining at home deliberately and missing all the services. I need the rest and felt that it was imperative. You see there is no let up for me. It is a constant strain from morning till night."

On 17 February 1901, the New York Times issued a retraction after receiving a different account of Ament's actions from Dr Judson Smith of the ABCFM, based on Ament's letter of 13 November 1900 to Smith. The Times reported that in Ament's own letter he indicated the compensation for the losses of the converts obtained by him had been "by appealing to the sense of justice among the villages where our people had lived." The Times concluded: "It seems that we have been led into doing an injustice to him ... In that case we have to express our sincere regret." In March the New York Sun printed an interview with Ament that indicated that the indemnity was not thirteen times the loss, but only one and one-third of the loss.

Twain indicated that he could not comment for publication, but would respond in the April edition of The North American Review. His representative indicated: "He hopes that both the Peking Missionary Association and the American Board of Foreign Missions will like it, but he has his doubts." In response to an open letter from the ABCFM demanding an apology, Twain penned "To My Missionary Critics," which offered no apologies, although it ended by acknowledging that missionaries no doubt mean well. The essay, originally entitled "The Case of Rev. Dr. Ament, Missionary," was published in the North American Review in April 1901. Twain explored the delicate moral difference between a demand thirteen times as great as it should be and a demand that was only one and a third times the correct amount. As Paine explains, "The point had been made by the board that it was the Chinese custom to make the inhabitants of a village responsible for individual crimes; and custom, likewise, to collect a third in excess of the damage, such surplus having been applied to the support of widows and orphans of the slain converts."

==== Ament arrested ====
In February 1901 Ament and two British subjects were arrested by German and French troops near Tungchow, and charged with trying to extort money from the Chinese villagers. While the two British subjects were released, Ament was held pending an appeal to United States Minister Conger. Ament was subsequently released at the direction of the German military commander, Count Alfred von Waldersee. Chamberlin indicated that the French and Germans, under pressure from the Americans, released him, insisting that he was never under arrest.

On 15 March 1901, Ament accused German soldiers of plundering the city of Man-Ming, a hundred kilometres from Beijing. Ament said that "they ransacked and desecrated a Christian chapel and despoiled the women of their trinkets, even tearing the rings out of their ears and ill-treating them in other ways. The Germans replied by charging the missionaries themselves with partaking of the plunder."

=== Third furlough (1901–1902) ===
Ament left Beijing on 26 March 1901 to return to the United States to make his case, clear his name and defend the reputation of the other missionaries. On 1 April 1901, Ament, refusing to be a scapegoat in the affair, cabled the following to the ABCFM:

Nothing has been done except after consultation with colleagues and the full approval of the United States Minister. I will secure a certificate from Mr. [Edwin H.] Conger to that effect.

Ament arrived back in the United States on 25 April 1901. On the same day, The New York Times reprinted an interview with Ament and Edwin H. Conger, the United States Minister to China (1898–1905), originally conducted in Kobe, Japan on 6 April 1901 while both men were en route to the United States. Conger defended the actions of Ament, indicating confiscated goods had been sold to ensure the survival of Chinese Christians. Conger indicated that the missionaries "only appropriated their property for justifiable ends."

In May 1901 Ament responded to his critics during an extended visit to the United States of America in 1901. In response to the criticisms of Twain and others, Ament denied that the missionaries forced the Chinese to accept Christianity, and that "We treat their beliefs kindly, try to extract the good, and never interfere with their customs, except where they interfere with Christianity."

On 16 May 1901, Ament addressing guests at the third annual Asiatic Society of America dinner in New York, again defended himself and his fellow missionaries:

The missionaries in China, of whom I am proud to be one, represent a class of American citizens whose work in the Orient have been purposefully misrepresented ... The missionaries' words have been twisted, wring interpretations made. The persistency of work like this can only justify the feeling that the root of this un-American warfare is due, not so much to what is seen or known of the deeds of missionaries, but the opposition to Christianity itself. The purpose was fixed before China was reached at all, and this murderous spirit stops not at injustice to individuals.

By the end of May 1901 ABCFM Board secretary Dr Judson Smith silenced Ament, as he believed further comments were damaging Ament and his colleagues. Smith attempted a final defence of Ament and the other missionaries in May in an essay entitled "The Missionaries and Their Critics."

Twain was unrepentant, referring to "Christian pirates like Ament and professional hypocrites and liars like Rev. Judson Smith of the American Board ... Whenever you ask people to support them [foreign missions] Joe, do bar China. Their presence there is forbidden by the Bible and by every sentiment of humanity – and fair dealing. And they have done vast mischief there. I would bar no other country."

=== Fourth missionary term in China (1902–1908) ===
In 1902, Ament and his family returned to Beijing, where he resumed his responsibilities as the pastor the South Chapel of the Congregational Church; and as a trustee of the board of the Methodist Episcopal Church's Peking University (later renamed Yenching University).

By 1902, North China was reported as being pacified. Fellow ABCFM missionary, Howard Spilman Galt (1872–1948) reported: "Everything seems to be remarkably quiet in the field where Dr. Ament took the first steps in reconstructing the work just a year ago. In no place could we discover any but the friendliest feelings toward him. Especially did the officials speak well of him."

==== Advocate of Christian unity ====
Ament was an ardent advocate for the "federation among Christian forces" in China, and supported the comity principle, whereby mission groups would be assigned their own areas for evangelisation to avoid direct competition with other agencies. In 1907 Ament, as chairman on the Committee on Church Union and Comity, presented a paper to the China Centenary Missionary Conference held at Shanghai. Missionary college, Rev. J.P. Jones, ABCFM missionary to India, wrote:

His broad Catholic spirit made him a leader among his peers in China in the advocacy of comity and federation among the Christian forces of that great land of China. The missionary body wisely chose him as the chairman of the Committee on Christian Union, of the Shanghai Conference. Few know how thoroughly and eagerly he studied this fundamental question, but we all know how eloquently and convincingly he advocated the cause of union in his report at the great conference. And Christian union in that far-off land will owe more to his sagacity and eager advocacy than any one can now realize.

==== Illness ====
From late July 1908, Ament underwent a series of four operations in the seaside town of Pei Tai Ho (now Beidaihe), Hebei to relieve a serious septic medical condition. He was able to return to Beijing in October, but by 8 November he had developed severe pressure on his brain, necessitating the decision to repatriate him to the United States. The Aments left Beijing on 24 November 1908, and departed China for the final time from Shanghai on 1 December 1908 on the Nippon Maru. After transiting Kobe, Japan, they arrived in San Francisco on Christmas Day in 1908. Ament was transferred to the Lane Hospital, but his condition was deemed inoperable.

=== Death ===
Despite being "a man of unusual physical endurance, ... after thirty-six years of service and much intense strain", Ament died at the Lane Hospital in San Francisco on 6 January 1909, at the age of 57, with both his wife, and son, Will, with him. Medical authorities determined that : "An abscess of the brain, resulting from septic conditions, was the source of the later symptoms and disabilities."

Ament was buried in Owosso, Michigan on Tuesday, 12 January 1909 after a funeral conducted in his home church, the First Congregational Church. Memorial services were held for Ament on Sunday, 17 January 1909 at Owosso, Michigan; Medina, Ohio; and at the Dwight Place Congregational Church, New Haven, Connecticut. A final memorial service was held on Sunday 14 February 1909 at the Teng Shih K'ou (now Deng Shi Kou) Congregational Church in Beijing, with the Chinese language service at 2.00 pm, and the English language service at 4.30 pm.

== Evaluation of Ament and his ministry ==
Missionary colleague Charles Ewing in a letter dated 2 January 1899, provided an evaluation of Ament and his ministry:

Dr. Ament was the preacher yesterday and held his audience well throughout his rather extended discourse. ... I suppose there can be little doubt that Dr. Ament is the best Chinese [language] preacher in the city. The people like to hear him. And then, he is exceedingly good in personal work, taking an interest in men individually and winning them. This kind of pastoral work is just as invaluable here as it is at home. ... In every way, it is a great advantage to have the senior member of the station [Peking] back on the field and at work again. And then, Dr. Ament is a great worker. How he gets through with so much work, I don't know. I was always said that he could do two men's work ...

A colleague called Ament the "ideal missionary" in recognition of his dedication, courage, proficiency and expertise in China and the Chinese language, and leadership of his flock of Chinese Christians. After his death, the Owosso, Michigan newspaper indicated that Ament "was easily the most useful man Owosso ever produced." A street in Owosso was named in his honour. Ament is regarded as one of the former residents of Owosso "who have made national and international impacts on society".

In a letter to Myra Smith on 27 February 1909, not long after Ament's death, Charles Ewing, one of Ament's colleagues, wrote:

I have just been writing today to Will Ament. You must know of the death of his father Dr. [William] Ament, on 6 January. I wanted to give Will a new view on the largeness and strength of his father. He is the best evangelistic worker and the most successful organizer that we have ever had in the Mission. His loss will be felt seriously, both by the work and by the workers personally. But he had done his work so thoroly [sic] and well that no other station could lose its leading worker and be left so strong as Peking. After many years of most faithful, earnest, painstaking labor, he had just succeeded in getting everything into such shape that, as he faced death, it was not with the sense of duties left undone, but in the calm assurance that now at last he could be spared.

In 1935 William E. Griffis indicated

For the missionaries and diplomatists there were rescue, food, and certain indemnity; but what of the native Christians exiled from their homes and fields, of which only vestiges remained? Where was even food to come from? In such a crisis, brave men, like the American Dr. Ament, went out into the open country. According to justice and immemorial custom in China, he compelled the village elders, who had connived at, or encouraged the Boxers, to furnish supplies of food. From the confiscated property in Peking, money was obtained to support the native Christians until they could be sent home. This action was misunderstood and maligned at home by a popular author. He "caught a Tartar" in attacking Dr. Ament, who showed the true facts.

According to a 2009 book by Larry Thompson, Ament's "resourceful heroism was tarnished by hubris and looting." Once publicly criticized by Mark Twain, Ament grew notorious in the controversy surrounding foreign missionaries in China."

== Writings of William Scott Ament ==
=== Articles ===
- "The Ancient Coinage of China." The American Journal of Archaeology and of the History of the Fine Arts 4:3 (September 1888):284–290.
- "A Bishop's Loot," Independent 53 (1901):2217–2218.
- "The Charges against Missionaries," Independent 53 (1901): 1051–52.
- "The Chinese Settlement once more". Independent (12 September 1901):2147.
- "Chinese Temperance Legislation". Journal of the North China Branch of the Royal Asiatic Society of Great Britain and Ireland 20 (1885): 254. Shanghai: Shanghai Literary and Scientific Society. Kelly & Walsh, 1885.
- "Marco Polo in Cambaluc: A Comparison of Foreign and Native Accounts". Peking Oriental Society Journal 3:2 (1892):97–122.
- "A Periodical Literature for China."
- "Romanism in China". The Chinese Recorder 14 (January–February 1883): 47–55.
- The Chinese Recorder 24 (July 1893): 343–344.
- "The Spiritual Needs of Native Christians", 44ff. In The Evangelisation of China: Addresses Delivered at Five Conferences of Christian Workers, Held During August, September and October 1896, at Chefoo, Peking, Shanghai, Foochow and Hankow. Edited by David Willard Lyon. Published by The Tientsin Press, pub. by the National Committee of the College Young Men's Christian Association of China, 1897.

=== Books ===
- Comity and Federation. Published by Centenary Missionary Conference, 1906.
- The Giant Awakened. n.p., n.d.

== Sources and further reading ==
=== Articles ===
==== Contemporaneous (1877–1910) ====
- Barton, James L. "An Appreciation of Dr. Ament". Missionary Herald (February 1909).
- Bellamy, Francis Rufus. Article in New Outlook. Outlook Publishing Company, Inc., 1901. See pages 377–388 for Ament.
- Chautauqua Institution. The Chautauquan 34 (1902):13. Chautauqua Literary and Scientific Circle, 1902.
- Fibre & Fabric: A Record of American Textile Industries in the Cotton and Woolen Trade 33 (1901). Details arrest of Ament.
- "The Giant Awakened", Gleanings in Bee Culture 37 (1909):23ff. Published by A. I. Root Co., 1909. Article on Ament with reference to his pastorate in Medina, Ohio.
- Gilman, Daniel Coit; Harry Thurston Peck; and Frank Moore Colby. "William Scott Ament", 435. In The New International Encyclopaedia. Dodd, Mead and Company, 1902.
- Mitchell, John Ames, ed. Life. Vol. 37 (1901). Page 298.
- Reid, Gilbert. "The Ethics of the Last War," Forum 32 (1902):446-55.
- Reid, Gilbert. "The Ethics of Loot," Forum 31 (1901):581-86.
- Reid, Gilbert. North-China Herald, (27 March 1901):602-3.
- Smith, Arthur Henderson. North-China Herald (19 June 1901):1193–94.
- Smith, Judson. "The Missionaries and their Critics," North American Review 172 (May 1901):724–733.
- Smith, Judson. North-China Herald (3 April 1901):660-61.
- Smylie, James H. (January 2001). "The Preacher: Mark Twain and Slaying Christians". Theology Today. Archived from the original on 17 January 2009 – via FindArticles.
- Twain, Mark. "To My Missionary Critics". The North American Review 172 (April 1901):520. On-line:
- Twain, Mark. "To the Person Sitting in Darkness". The North American Review 172 (February 1901):161. On-line:
- "The Future of China." Oberlin Review (10 October 1901): 40–41.
- United States War Dept. Report of the Lieutenant-General Commanding the Army, in Seven Parts: Military Operations in China. 1900. See page 138 for reference to Ament.
- Wilder, G.D. "Wm. Scott Ament," Chinese Recorder (May 1909):276-81.

==== Recent ====
- Gibson, William M. "Mark Twain and Howells: Anti-Imperialists." The New England Quarterly (December 1947): 435ff.
- Hunt, Michael H. "The Forgotten Occupation: Peking, 1900–1901." The Pacific Historical Review 48:4 (November 1979):501–529.
- Kinch, J.C.B. "Europe and Elsewhere", in The Mark Twain Encyclopedia. Page 261.
- King, H.H. "The Boxer Indemnity: 'Nothing but Bad'" Modern Asian Studies 40:3 (2006):663–689.
- Maier-Katkin, Birgit and Daniel Maier-Katkin. "At the Heart of Darkness: Crimes Against Humanity and the Banality of Evil". Human Rights Quarterly 26:3 (August 2004):584–604.
- Newman, Rhoda. "Mark Twain, Internationalist: Travel writer and diplomat wannabe waxes satirically on envoys, imperialism." Foreign Service Journal (February 1996):18–23; http://www.twainweb.net/filelist/intl01.html.
- Scully, Eileen P. "Taking the Low Road to Sino-American Relations: "Open Door" Expansionists and the Two China Markets". The Journal of American History 82:1 (June 1995):62–83.
- Titta, R. "Mark Twain and the Onset of the Imperialist Period." The Internationalist (September–October 1997).

=== Books ===
==== Contemporaneous (1877–1950) ====
- American Council of Learned Societies Devoted to Humanistic Studies, Dictionary of American Biography. Volume 1. New York: Charles Scribner's Sons, 1964. See page 241 for article on Ament.
- Barton, James L. The Missionary and His Critics New York, NY: Fleming H. Revell Company, 1906.
- Chamberlin, Georgia Louise, ed. Ordered to China: Letters of Wilbur J. Chamberlin Written from China While Under Commission from the New York Sun During the Boxer Uprising of 1900 and the International Complications which Followed. F. A. Stokes company, 1903. Chamberlin sent the initial despatch that fueled the Indemnity Controversy between Twain and Ament.
- Clark, Francis Edward. Memories of Many Men in Many Lands: An Autobiography. United Society of Christian Endeavor, 1922.
- Conger, Sarah Pike. Letters from China: With Particular Reference to the Empress Dowager and the Women of China. A.C. McClurg & Co., 1910.
- Cromer, Jeremiah C. "William S. Ament: An Ideal Missionary". Pamphlet, Envelope Series 12, no. 2 (July 1909).
- Denby, Charles. China and Her People: Being the Observations, Reminiscences, and Conclusions of an American Diplomat. L.C. Page & company, 1905. Denby defends Ament's role in collecting indemnities after the Boxer Uprising. See pages 217–218 of Volume One. Volume One, Volume Two
- Griffis, William Elliot. China's Story: In Myth, Legend, And Annals. Rev. ed. Boston and New York: Houghton Mifflin, 1935.
- Ketler, Isaac Conrad. The Tragedy of Paotingfu: An Authentic Story of the Lives, Services and Sacrifices of the Presbyterian, Congregational and China Inland Missionaries who Suffered Martyrdom at Paotingfu, China, 30 June and 1 July 1900 Revell, 1902.
- Latourette, Kenneth Scott. A History of Christian Missions in China. The Macmillan company, 1929.
- Lumis, Charles Fletcher. The Land of Sunshine. Vol. 14. F.A. Pattee, 1901. Page 237.
- McIntosh, Gilbert. Is There Anything in It?: Some After-crisis Vindications. Morgan & Scott, 1902. Pages 48–56.
- Memoriam William Scott Ament, 1851–1909: Memorial Addresses, Tungchou, 1909, 47pp.
- Miner, Luella. China's Book of Martyrs: A Record of Heroic Martyrdoms and Marvelous Deliverances of Chinese Christians During the Summer of 1900 Jennings and Pye, 1903. Pages 79, 243.
- Oberlin College. "Annual Reports". (September 1908 – October 1909):384–385.
- Paine, Albert Bigelow. Mark Twain: A Biography: The Personal and Literary Life of Samuel Langhorne Clemens. "Mark Twain and the Missionaries." Chapter CCXIV.
- Porter, Henry Dwight. William Scott Ament: Missionary of the American Board to China Revell, 1911.
- Rose, Martha Emily Parmelee. The Western Reserve of Ohio and Some of Its Pioneers, Places and Women's Clubs, National American Woman Suffrage Association Collection. Euclid Print. Co., 1914. See page 133.
- Russell, Nellie Naomi.Gleanings from Chinese Folklore: With some of her stories of life in China, to which are added memorial sketches of the author from associates and friends. Comp. Mary Harriet Porter. Chicago: Fleming H. Revell, 1915. Page 34.
- Shaw, William. The Evolution of an Endeavorer: An Autobiography. Boston: Christian Endeavor World, 1924. See pages 227–228, 319–320.
- Twain, Mark. Mark Twain: Collected Tales, Sketches, Speeches, and Essays: Volume 2: 1891–1910. Library of America, 1992.
- William Scott Ament: Addresses Given at the Memorial Services Held at Teng Shih K'ou Congregational Church, Peking, China, Sunday, February Fourteenth, Nineteen Hundred Nine. North China Union College Press, 1909.

==== Recent ====
- Bickers, Robert A. and R. G. Tiedemann. The Boxers, China, and the World. Rowman & Littlefield, 2007. ISBN 0-7425-5395-7, ISBN 978-0-7425-5395-8.
- Deane, Hugh. Good Deeds & Gunboats: Two Centuries of American-Chinese Encounters. China Books & Periodicals, 1990. See page 66 for the Ament-Twain controversy.
- Edwards, Dwight Woodbridge. Yenching University. United Board for Christian Higher Education in Asia, 1959. Pages 13, 34.
- Ewing, Charles Edward; and Bessie Smith Ewing. Death Throes of a Dynasty: Letters and Diaries of Charles and Bessie Ewing, Missionaries to China. Ed. E. G. Ruoff. Kent State University Press, 1990.
- Foner, Philip Sheldon. Mark Twain: Social Critic. International Publishers, 1958. See page 280.
- Geismar, Maxwell David. Mark Twain: An American Prophet. Houghton Mifflin, 1970. See 207–209 for analysis of Twain's attack on Ament.
- [Gu, Changsheng] [顾长声]. 从马礼逊到司徒雷登—来华新教传教士评传 [From Morrison to Stuart: Critical Reviews on Protestant Missionaries in China. 上海人民出版社 [Shanghai: Shanghai Renmin Chubanshe], 1985. Includes Ament.
- Harris, Susan K. "Mark Twain and America's Christian Mission Abroad", In A Companion to Mark Twain, eds. Peter Messent and Louis J. Budd. Blackwell, 2005. ISBN 978-1-4051-2379-2.
- Hunter, Jane. The Gospel of Gentility: American Women Missionaries in Turn-of-the-Century China. Yale University Press, 1984.
- Lodwick, Kathleen, ed. The "Chinese Recorder" Index: A Guide to Christian Missions in Asia, 1867–1941. Rowman & Littlefield, 1986. See index on page 7 for extensive list of articles by both William & Mary Ament.
- Lutz, Jesse Gregory. China and the Christian Colleges, 1850–1950. Cornell University Press, 1971.
- Miller, Stuart Creighton. "Ends and Means: Missionary Justification of Force in Nineteenth Century China," The Missionary Enterprise in China and America, ed. J.K. Fairbank (Cambridge, MA: Harvard University Press, 1974):249–282.
- Oggel, L. Terry. "American Board of Foreign Missions", p. 23. In The Mark Twain Encyclopedia, edited by J. R. LeMaster; James Darrell Wilson; and Christie Graves Hamric. Taylor & Francis, .
- Preston, Diana. Besieged in Peking: The Story of the 1900 Boxer Rising. Constable, 1999. Page 69.
- Preston, Diana. The Boxer Rebellion: The Dramatic Story of China's War on Foreigners that Shook the World in the Summer of 1900. Walker, 2000; See page 395. Berkley Books, 2001. See page 291 for a description of missionary "looting".
- Shavit, David. The United States in Asia: A Historical Dictionary. Greenwood, 1990. See pages 6–7 for an article on Ament.
- Strong, William Ellsworth. The Story of the American Board: An Account of the First Hundred Years of the American Board for Foreign Missions. Arno Press, 1969.
- Thompson, Larry Clinton. William Scott Ament and the Boxer Rebellion: Heroism, Hubris and the Ideal Missionary. McFarland & Company, March 2009.

=== Dissertations and Theses ===
- Wong, Lai Hang. "Protestant Missionary Concepts of and Revolutions in China, 1895–1911." A Dissertation. Presented to the Faculty of Arts in partial fulfillment of the requirements for the Master of Arts, University of Hong Kong, 1976.
