= To the Person Sitting in Darkness =

Anti-imperialist essay by Mark Twain

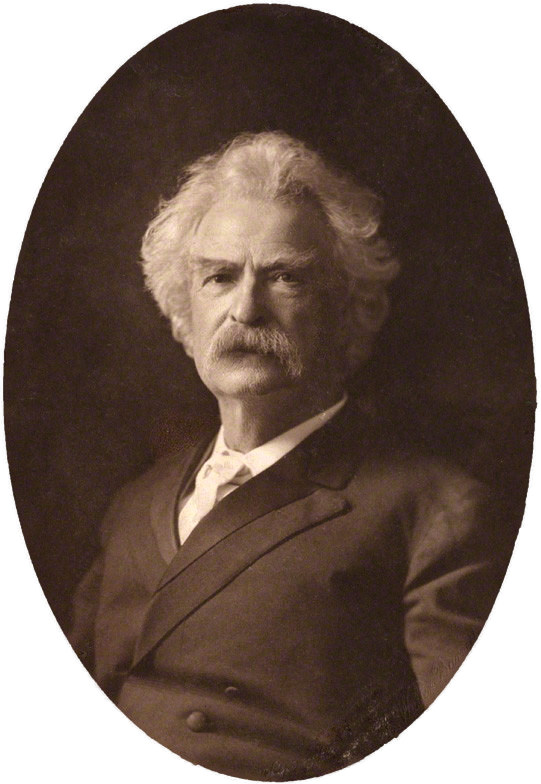
American writer Mark Twain replied to the imperialism Kipling espoused in "The White Man's Burden" (1899) with the satirical essay "To the Person Sitting in Darkness" (1901), about the anti-imperialist Boxer Rebellion (1899) in China.

"To the Person Sitting in Darkness" is an essay by American author Mark Twain published in the North American Review in February 1901. It is a satire exposing imperialism as revealed in the Boxer Rebellion and its aftermath, the Boer War, and the Philippine–American War, expressing Twain's anti-imperialist views. It makes reference to the contemporary figures Emilio Aguinaldo, William McKinley, Joseph Chamberlain, William Scott Ament and others, and fueled the Twain–Ament indemnities controversy.

== Background ==
Mark Twain was an outspoken critic of American involvement in the Philippines and China, and "one of the mammoth figures in anti-imperialism, and certainly the foremost anti-imperialist literary figure,” having become in January 1901 a vice president of the Anti-Imperialist League of New York. James Smylie, a professor of church history, said of the controversy: "Twain went after the respected Congregationalist minister, Reverend William Scott Ament, director of the American Board of Commissioners for Foreign Missions. Ament joined other powers in seeking indemnities from the Chinese after the Boxer Rebellion against western exploitation in 1900. Twain, perhaps unfairly, was shocked that Ament would use such blood money for the 'propagation of the Gospel' and to promote the 'blessings of civilization' to brothers and sisters who 'sit in darkness.' He declared to missionaries: 'Come home and Christianize Christians in the states!'"

According to Twain biographer Albert Bigelow Paine, "Twain, of course, was fiercely stirred. The missionary idea had seldom appealed to him, and coupled with this business of bloodshed, it was less attractive than usual. He printed the clippings in full, one following the other; then he said:

By happy luck we get all these glad tidings on Christmas Eve—just the time to enable us to celebrate the day with proper gaiety and enthusiasm. Our spirits soar and we find we can even make jokes; taels I win, heads you lose.

== Title ==
The title of the article is "an ironic reference to Matthew 4:16 — 'The people who sat in darkness have seen a great light', and used by the Christian missionaries when referring to the 'savage', 'heathen', 'uncivilized' populations of the lands the imperialists were conquering." It was also a reaction to the intervention philosophy of British writer Rudyard Kipling's pro-imperialistic February 1899 poem The White Man's Burden. The title was "a play upon the idea of western civilization being 'enlightened'". Kipling had used the image when he wrote:

The cry of hosts ye humor (Ah, slowly!) toward the light:-- 'Why brought ye us from bondage,

Our loved Egyptian night?'

== Content ==
"Without any doubt 'To the Person Sitting in Darkness' is Twain's most famous anti-imperialist piece. The satire is extraordinarily dark and Twain does not hesitate to taunt those whom he considers to be immoral including McKinley as the 'Master of the Game,' the missionaries, and the trusts." Zwick describes it as "an acid indictment of the brutalities the British, French, German, Belge, Spanish, Portuguese, Russian and American capitalist governments were committing all over the world." According to Susan Harris:

“To the Person Sitting in Darkness,” which Mark Twain published in the North American Review in 1901, attacks Western imperialism as it was manifesting itself in South Africa, China, Cuba, and the Philippines. It names its villains–[William] McKinley, Joseph Chamberlain, the Kaiser, the Czar – and their instruments, especially the Reverend William Scott Ament, a Congregationalist minister who was affiliated with the American Board of Commissioners for Foreign Missions.

"Twain lampooned missionary morality and likened it to questionable American activities in the Philippines". According to Foner, Twain used the conduct of Ament to "drive home the point that the missionary movement served as a front for imperialism."

At one point in the essay, Twain made a sardonic suggestion for what the flag of the Philippines under American control should look like; "And as for a flag for the Philippine Province, it is easily managed. We can have a special one—our States do it: we can have just our usual flag, with the white stripes painted black and the stars replaced by the skull and cross-bones."

"He went on to score Ament, to compare the missionary policy in China to that of the Pawnee Indians, and to propose for him a monument—subscriptions to be sent to the American Board. He denounced the national policies in Africa, China, and the Philippines, and showed by the reports and by the private letters of soldiers home, how cruel and barbarous and fiendish had been the warfare made by those whose avowed purpose was to carry the blessed light of civilization and Gospel 'to the benighted native'—how in very truth these priceless blessings had been handed on the point of a bayonet to the 'Person Sitting in Darkness.' Mark Twain never wrote anything more scorching, more penetrating in its sarcasm, more fearful in its revelation of injustice and hypocrisy, than his article 'To the Person Sitting in Darkness.' He put aquafortis on all the raw places, and when it was finished he himself doubted the wisdom of printing it."

== Censorship ==
In Europe and Elsewhere (1923), Twain's literary executor, Albert Bigelow Paine, altered "To the Person Sitting in Darkness," a work that Twain himself had seen through the press, by removing the controversial section on William Ament and the indemnities issue in China in the aftermath of the Boxer Rebellion.

== See also ==
- American exceptionalism
- American imperialism
- British imperialism
- Development theory
- Christian mission
- Civilizing mission
- Criticism of capitalism
- Criticism of Christianity
- Economic growth
- Economic inequality
- First World problem
- Global North and Global South
- Italian fascism and racism
  - Faccetta Nera
  - "Manifesto of Race"
- Noble Savage
- Orientalism
- The Tears of the White Man, by Pascal Bruckner
- The Tyranny of Guilt, by Pascal Bruckner
- Valladolid debate
- White savior
- "Yellow Peril"
