= Edward Atkinson (activist) =

United States businessman and economist (1827–1905)

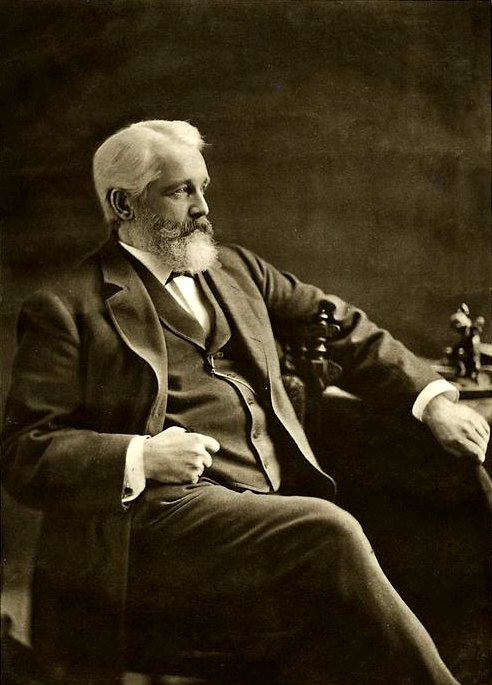
- Born: February 10, 1827; Brookline, Massachusetts, U.S.
- Died: December 11, 1905 (aged 78); Boston, Massachusetts, U.S.
- Spouse: Mary Caroline Heath (m. 1855)

Academic background
- Education: Dartmouth College, Ph.D.; University of South Carolina, LL.D.
- Influences: Adam Smith; Richard Cobden; John Bright; Frédéric Bastiat

Academic work
- Discipline: Economics, politics
- School or tradition: Liberalism
- Institutions: American Academy of Arts and Sciences; American Anti-Imperialist League
- Notable ideas: Diffusion of anti-imperialism in the United States

Edward Atkinson (February 10, 1827 – December 11, 1905) was an economist, inventor, and a founder of the American Anti-Imperialist League.

== Biography ==
=== Early years ===
Edward Atkinson was born in Brookline, Massachusetts and educated in private schools. He received a Ph.D. from Dartmouth College and an LL.D. from the University of South Carolina. In the decade before the Civil War, Atkinson was a successful entrepreneur as an executive of some of the leading cotton mills of New England. Later, he was President of Boston Manufacturers Mutual Insurance Company and the Mutual Boiler Insurance Company of Boston.

Atkinson married Mary Caroline Heath in 1855; they had 9 children, 7 of whom survived to adulthood. One of his sons, Robert Whitman Atkinson (1868–1934) was a musician and composer best known for composing "The Party at Odd Fellows Hall", a popular waltz of the 1890s, to words by J. Wendell Jr.

In 1886 Atkinson invented an improved kitchen stove known as the "Aladdin cooker," a slow-cooking device that used a minimal power input, akin to the principle employed by the modern crock pot.

=== Political activity ===
Atkinson fought against slavery by supporting the Free-Soil Party and the Boston Vigilance Committee, an organization that aided escaped slaves. Growing weary of compromise, he began raising money to pay for rifles and ammunition to support the insurgent guerrilla force of John Brown. In 1866, he was chosen a delegate to the national union convention held in Philadelphia, but he took no part in its deliberations. He was elected a Fellow of the American Academy of Arts and Sciences in 1879.

He was inspired by the ideas of Adam Smith, Richard Cobden, and John Bright, and he became a leading publicist for free trade. In many ways, he can be described as the American counterpart to Frédéric Bastiat. He spoke out against the inflationist ideas of William Jennings Bryan and others but, unlike some, favored the total denationalization or privatization of money.

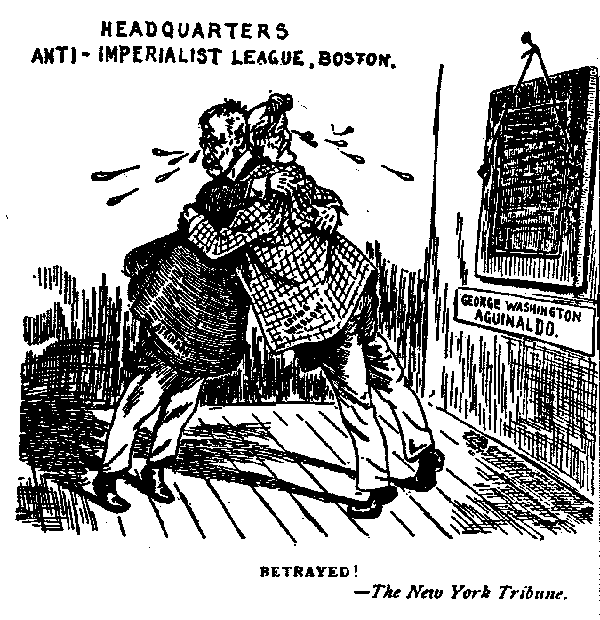
Cartoon depicting Erving Winslow and Edward Atkinson of the American Anti-Imperialist League mourning Aguinaldo's capture. By the pro-expansion paper, New York Tribune, reprinted Literary Digest, 22 (April 13, 1901).

He campaigned for Grover Cleveland and participated in the formation of the Clevelandite National Democratic ticket in 1896. Atkinson was appalled by the colonialist and imperialist policies of the McKinley and Roosevelt administrations in the wake of the Spanish–American War. He reacted by becoming a full-time activist in the American Anti-Imperialist League, and was opposed to U.S. intervention against Spain in Cuba and the Philippines. As a vice president of that organization, Atkinson wrote to the United States Department of War for a list of soldiers serving in the Philippines so that he might send them his privately published pamphlets. Failing to receive a reply, Atkinson announced to the press that he was sending copies to Generals Lawton, Miller, and Otis, Admiral Dewey, correspondent J. F. Bass, and to Jacob Shurman and Dean Worcestrer on the Philippine Commission.

On February 17, 1899, Edward Atkinson sent three pamphlets to test the right of citizens of the United States to the free use of the mail:

- "The Cost of a National Crime," detailing the American military oppression of the Filipinos and the spiraling cost of the war to American taxpayers.
- "The Hell of War and Its Penalties"
- "Criminal Aggression: By Whom Committed?"

United States Postmaster General Charles Emory Smith ordered that the pamphlets be seized in San Francisco, declaring them "seditious". The United States Attorney General hinted that he would charge Atkinson with treason and sedition, but decided against it, as officials feared that charging him would only make the 72-year-old a martyr.

The US pro-expansion press called Atkinson a "latter-day copperhead". Atkinson seemed to enjoy the infamy, and he effusively and sarcastically thanked the Administration for calling national attention to his essays and increasing their demand in every state in the union. On the other hand, sympathetic accounts portraying him as a "self-made man" were promptly refuted by Atkinson, who scoffed at the term itself. "You might as well speak of a self-laid egg," he countered, crediting the quote to his friend, the late Francis Lieber. (Note: Judging from this passage from an essay published by Atkinson in 1881, his subsequent, oft-cited "self-made" rebuttal contained a paraphrase, rather than a literal quote. Most of us are, I believe, what are called "self-made men," although I never use that term without recalling the funny outburst of my late friend, Dr. Francis Lieber, when I used it in his presence. "Self-made men, indeed!" said he; "Why don't you tell me of a self-laid egg?")

=== Death and legacy ===
Edward Atkinson died on December 11, 1905. He was 78 years old at the time of his death.

Atkinson's papers are housed at the Massachusetts Historical Society and include 32 cartons and six bound volumes of material.

== Works ==
For nearly four decades, Atkinson was actively engaged in the distribution of brochures of which he was the author on banking, competition, cotton manufacture, economic legislation, fire prevention, industrial education, the money question, and the tariff. In addition to his 1899 series of pamphlets, broadcast over the United States, which he entitled "The Anti-Imperialist:"

- Cheap Cotton by Free Labor (Boston, 1861)
- The Distribution of Products (New York, 1885)
- Margin of Profits (1887)
- Industrial Progress of the Nation (1889)
- Taxation and Work: A Series of Treatises on the Tariff and the Currency (New York 1892)
