= Elwood Gardner Tewksbury =

American Protestant missionary to China

Elwood Gardner Tewksbury (born 1865, West Newbury, Massachusetts d. Philadelphia, Pennsylvania, 1945) was a Protestant missionary of the American Board of Commissioners for Foreign Missions who served in China in the late nineteenth and early twentieth centuries.

== Life and career ==
Tewksbury graduated from Harvard College in 1887, and become one of the first missionary volunteers of the Student Volunteer Movement. He attended Hartford Theological Seminary, and received his degree in 1890, and was ordained at the East Somerville, Massachusetts, Congregational Church in 1890. Elwood and Grace Holbrook Tewksbury were married in 1890 and began serving, first 1890 – 1898 and then 1899 – 1906, in the North China mission station at Tongzhou, now a district of Beijing but then a suburb. Among other projects, he worked with the Tungchow Farm, a poor-relief program which produced foreign vegetables and fruits, taught physics and chemistry at the North China Union College.

They had two sons. Gardner was also a missionary in China and a language scholar., while Donald George (1894- 1958) taught at Teachers College of Columbia University and was a scholar in history of American higher education.

== Boxer uprising and aftermath ==
In the early summer of 1900, as Boxer attacks on Christians and missionaries increased, Tewksbury drew criticism for flying the American flag at the mission compound in Tongzhou, which seemed to confirm the charge that missions were establishing an independent kingdom in China. The day after Chinese army units escorted the Tungzhou missionaries to the capital in June, the mission and college were destroyed, and more than a dozen missionaries killed in nearby Baoding. Elwood and Grace and their two sons, spent the siege in the British legation, which Tewksbury helped to defend.

When Allied armies lifted the siege, his senior colleague, William Scott Ament enlisted Tewksbury's help in organizing food and housing for Chinese Christian families who had been attacked and left destitute by Boxers. With support from Chinese officials they took possession of an abandoned Mongol palace to use as headquarters, and followed the example of the British Legation, which had been holding auctions of looted goods and treasures they had confiscated or been given. Tewksbury demanded that American marines escort him to Tongzhou to settle claims for lost Christian property in 23 villages in which 166 Christians had been killed and 184 of their houses destroyed. Tewksbury took land to be used for future cemeteries or rented out to support widows and orphans. The amount of cash he collected represented the annual income of several hundred village families.

== Later life ==
Tewksbury returned to New York City in 1907, where he was executive secretary of the Laymen's and Young People's Missionary Movement from 1907 until 1910. He then returned to China, where he was first secretary for the China Sunday School Union in Shanghai, under the auspices of the World Sunday School Association. He was musical co-editor of the Chinese Hymnal. He traveled throughout China to share techniques of religious instruction and Sunday school management, encouraging the inclusion of athletics in Sunday schools, and supervised translation of a library of Sunday school books.

During the Second Sino-Japanese War Tewksbury was imprisoned in a Japanese concentration camp in Shanghai. Shortly after being freed and returning to the United States, he died in Presbyterian Hospital in Philadelphia.
