= Isaac C. Ketler =

American academic

Isaac C. Ketler (1853–1913) was the co-founder and first president of Grove City College, a Presbyterian college in Grove City, Pennsylvania.

== Biography ==
Ketler was born at Northumberland, Pennsylvania in 1853 and had eleven siblings. Ketler received his education at the National Normal School at Lebanon, Ohio, and also at Wooster University, Wooster, Ohio. He was also a graduate of Western Theological Seminary and received degrees of D.D. and LL.D., since his graduation.

One of Ketler's early teachers was Joseph Newton Pew who later went on to build a fortune in the oil industry. Ketler and Pew founded Pine Grove Normal Academy (eventually changing its name to Grove City College) in 1876. Ketler served as President of Grove City College for 37 years from 1876 to 1913. Joseph N. Pew provided much of the early funding for the school. Under Ketler's leadership: "[b]y the turn of the century, the enrollment had grown to 660 students, the faculty was enlarged to 20 members and the campus had increased to 40 acres with four substantial buildings." His son Weir Ketler later served as president of the college.
