= James H. Smylie =

American professor and author (1925–2019)

James Hutchinson Smylie (October 20, 1925 – January 5, 2019) was Professor of Church History at Union Theological Seminary & Presbyterian School of Christian Education and author of books on American church history and presbyterianism.

== Career ==
Smylie was born in Huntington, West Virginia, where his father was a pastor. He was educated at Washington University in St. Louis, where he graduated BA in 1946, and at Princeton Theological Seminary, where he was awarded his BD in 1949 and master's degree in 1950. He served as a Presbyterian minister in St. Louis, 1950–1952, and married Elizabeth Roblee at that time. From 1952 until 1962, he taught at Princeton Theological Seminary, initially while working on his PhD there, which was completed in 1958, under the supervision of Lefferts Loetscher. He began his work at Union Theological Seminary in Virginia (now Union/PSCE) in 1962, becoming full professor in 1968, and remained there until retiring in 1996.

His doctoral dissertation was on the subject of American Clergymen and the Constitution of the United States of America, 1780-1796 and his interests broadened from that topic to include church-state relations, human rights, and the impact of Presbyterian theology on American political thought.

== Works ==
For 28 years Smylie edited the Journal of Presbyterian History on behalf of the Presbyterian Historical Society, Philadelphia. Additionally he wrote the following books.

- Protestant Clergyment and American Destiny. United States of America Union Theological Seminary. 1963.
- A Cloud of Witnesses: A History of the Presbyterian Church in the United States. Richmond, Va: Covenant Life Curriculum Press. 1965.
- Into all the World. Richmond, Va: Covenant Life Curriculum Press. 1965.
- Go therefore: 150 years of Presbyterians in global mission. Presbyterian Publishing House. 1987.
- A Brief History of the Presbyterians. Geneva Press. 1996. ISBN 9780664500016.
- Between Warm-Up & Worship: Prayers for Choirs on the Run. Abingdon Press. 1998.
- A Review of a letter, from the Presbytery of Chillicothe, to the Presbytery of Mississippi, on the subject of slavery. Cornell University Library. 2007.
