= White guilt =

White people's guilt for racist harms

White guilt is a belief that white people bear a collective responsibility for the harm which has resulted from historical (ancestral sin) or current racist treatment of people belonging to other ethnic groups, as for example in the context of the Atlantic slave trade, European colonialism, and the genocide of indigenous peoples.

In certain regions of the Western world, it can be called white settler guilt, white colonial guilt, and other variations, which refer to the guilt more pointedly in relation to European settlement and colonization. The concept of white guilt has examples both historically and currently in the United States, Australia and to a lesser extent in Canada, The Netherlands, South Africa, France, and the United Kingdom. The feeling of white guilt has been described by psychologists such as Lisa Spanierman and Mary Heppner as one of the psychosocial consequences of racism for white individuals along with empathy for victims of racism and fear of non-white people.

== History ==
=== Early usage ===
The phrase "white guilt" was first levelled as an accusation, as when James Baldwin wrote that "No curtain under heaven is heavier than that curtain of guilt and lies behind which white Americans hide" in his essay "The White Man's Guilt", first published in 1965. Martin Luther King similarly maintained that racism was a collective national shame, rather than a personal one, saying in 1965 that "Racial injustice is still the Negro's burden and America's shame." Or, as he put it in 1968, "Everyone must share in the guilt as individuals and as institutions. The government must certainly share the guilt; individuals must share the guilt; even the church must share the guilt."

The phrase has come to be used in a psychological sense, to designate feelings of guilt held by white people. Judith Katz, the author of the 1978 publication White Awareness: Handbook for Anti-Racism Training, is critical of what she calls self-indulgent white guilt fixations. Her concerns about white guilt led her to move from black-white group encounters to all-white groups in her anti-racism training. She also avoided using non-white people to re-educate white people, she said, because she found this led white people to focus on getting acceptance and forgiveness rather than changing their own actions or beliefs.

A report in The Washington Post from 1978 describes the exploitation of white guilt by white con artists making a pretence of representing minority-oriented companies or publications: "Telephone and mail solicitors, trading on 'white guilt' and on government pressure to advertise in minority-oriented publications, are inducing thousands of businessmen to buy ads in phony publications." The companies selling the advertising used white actors putting on Black or Mexican accents to sell advertising space in publications that were never circulated to the public.

=== Academic research ===
In 1999, academic research conducted at the University of Pennsylvania examined the extent of societal feeling of white guilt, possible guilt-based antecedents, and white guilt's relationship to attitudes towards affirmative action. The four studies revealed that "Even though mean White guilt tended to be low, with the mean being just below the midpoint of the scale, the range and variability confirms the existence of feelings of White guilt for some". The findings also showed that white guilt was directly linked to "more negative personal evaluations" of white people generally, and the extent of an individual's feelings of white guilt independently predicted attitudes towards white privilege, racial discrimination and affirmative action.

2003 research at the University of California, Santa Cruz, in its first study, replicated the link between white guilt and strength of belief in white privilege. The second study revealed that white guilt "resulted from seeing European Americans as perpetrators of racial discrimination", and was also predictive of support for compensatory efforts for African Americans.

One academic paper suggests that in France, white guilt may be a common feature of management of race relations – in contrast to other European countries.

A 2019 review of two studies finds that "among social liberals, learning about White privilege reduces sympathy, increases blame, and decreases external attributions for White people struggling with poverty."

== Regions ==
=== In the United States ===
American civil rights activist Bayard Rustin wrote that reparations for slavery would be an exploitation of white guilt and damage the "integrity of blacks". In 2006, then-Senator Barack Obama wrote in his book The Audacity of Hope that "rightly or wrongly, white guilt has largely exhausted itself in America". His view on the subject was based on an interaction in the US Senate, where he witnessed a white legislator complain about being made to "feel more white" when a black colleague discussed systemic racism with them.

Shelby Steele, a conservative black political writer, criticized the concept in his 2006 book White Guilt: How Blacks and Whites Together Destroyed the Promise of the Civil Rights Era. Steele accused some black people of exploiting white guilt by posing as victims of white racism. Steele called this a disingenuous bid for political power by using white guilt to claim exclusive moral authority.

George F. Will, a conservative American political columnist, wrote: "[White guilt is] a form of self-congratulation, where whites initiate 'compassionate policies' toward people of color, to showcase their innocence to racism."

In 2015, when it came to light American civil rights activist Rachel Dolezal had been posing as African American, Washington Post journalist Krissah Thompson described her as "an archetype of white guilt played to its end". Thompson discussed the issue with psychologist Derald Wing Sue, an expert on racial identity, who suggested that Dolezal had become so fascinated by racism and racial justice issues she "over-identified" with black people. In 2016, the school district of Henrico County, Virginia ceased future use of an educational video, Structural Discrimination: The Unequal Opportunity Race, which visualized white privilege and structural racism. Parents complained, calling it a white guilt video, which led to a ban by the county's superintendent.

Since 2016, white liberals rate non-white groups more positively than they do whites. Every other racial group feels more positive about their own race than they do about other races, according to polling carried out by American National Election Studies in 2018. This has been attributed to a desire to separate themselves from the racist-appearing postures of then-president Donald Trump and some of his followers.

In October 2018, The Economist proposed that an increase in Americans claiming Native American ancestry, often incorrectly, may be explained by attempts to "absolve them of collective European guilt for the genocide of indigenous people". In 2019, it was alleged that liberal white Americans were being influenced by white guilt, changing patterns of political and social behaviour to be more racially inclusive after the election of Donald Trump. This included the methods by which Democratic nominees were being considered for the 2020 presidential election.

In October 2019, students at a middle school in Massachusetts raised money for the Mashpee Wampanoag Tribe, after they learned about the mistreatment of the tribe's ancestors by European colonists. The director of the school said it had "left all our students with this sense of European guilt, or something", and one student remarked "If we don't try to repair what our ancestors did, the tribes will die off".

=== In Australia ===
Author Sally Morgan 1987's book My Place, which explores Aboriginal identity, has come under critique for providing European Australians with a narrative of colonization in Australia which, critics argue, considerably minimizes white settler guilt. Marcia Langton has described the book as a kind of an unearned clearance for European guilt: "The book is a catharsis. It gives release and relief, not so much to Aboriginal people oppressed by psychotic racism, as to the whites who wittingly and unwittingly participated in it".

=== In New Zealand ===
In New Zealand, the legacy of the colonisation of New Zealand by European settlers has created a localized sense of white guilt in relation to the resulting damage to pre-existing Māori culture and mistreatment of the indigenous Māori people. Then opposition leader Bill English gave a speech in 2002 in which he rejected the "cringing guilt" said to be felt amongst the Pākehā as a result of the colonisation of Aotearoa by their ancestors. English's speech came in response to the government's Race Relations Commissioner, who compared the impact of the colonisation of New Zealand to the destruction of the Bamiyan Buddhas by the Taliban.

Academic Elizabeth Rata has proposed that "without the mirror image of unexpiated guilt, a necessary process in the recognition and validation of a shared reality, Pākehā guilt moved, not onto the next stage of externalised shame, but into an internal and enclosed narcissism". In her analysis, she suggests that the Waitangi Tribunal has been a missed opportunity to reconcile white guilt in New Zealand.

== Critical opinions ==
Commentator Sunny Hundal, writing for The Guardian, stated it is "reductionist" to assign political opinions to a collective guilt such as "white guilt" and few people on the left actually hold the views being ascribed to them by the conservative writers who expound on the concept of "white guilt" and its implications. Hundal concludes: "Not much annoys me more than the stereotype that to be liberal is to be full of guilt. To be socially liberal, in my view, is to be more mindful of compassion and empathy for others…to label that simply as guilt is just...insulting."

In 2015, Gary Younge explored white guilt's impotence in society, writing: "It won't close the pay gap, the unemployment gap, the wealth gap or the discrepancy between black and white incarceration. It won't bring back Walter Scott, Trayvon Martin or Brandon Moore." Coleman Hughes has suggested that white guilt causes the misdirection of anti-racist efforts, writing that "where white guilt is endemic, demands to redress racism will be strongest, regardless of how much racism actually exists".

== Works about white guilt ==
- The Tears of the White Man: Compassion as Contempt, a 1983 book by the French philosopher Pascal Bruckner
- The Tyranny of Guilt: An Essay on Western Masochism, a 2006 book by Pascal Bruckner
- White Guilt: How Blacks and Whites Together Destroyed the Promise of the Civil Rights Era, a 2006 book by American author Shelby Steele
- Whites, Jews, and Us: Toward a Politics of Revolutionary Love, a 2016 book by the French-Algerian political activist Houria Bouteldja
- White Fragility: Why It's So Hard for White People to Talk About Racism; a 2018 book by Robin DiAngelo about race relations in the United States

== See also ==
- White savior
- Anti-Japaneseism
- Colonial mentality
- German collective guilt
- Internalized racism
- Reverse racism
- Self-hating Jew
- Holocaust
- Romani genocide
- California genocide
- Slavery in the United States
- Treatment of slaves in the United States
- Racism against Black Americans
- Self-hatred
- Antisemitism
- Anti-Romani sentiment
- Anti-Mexican sentiment
- Native American genocide
- Australian history wars
- Hilary Beckles
