= The White Man's Burden =

Poem by the English poet Rudyard Kipling

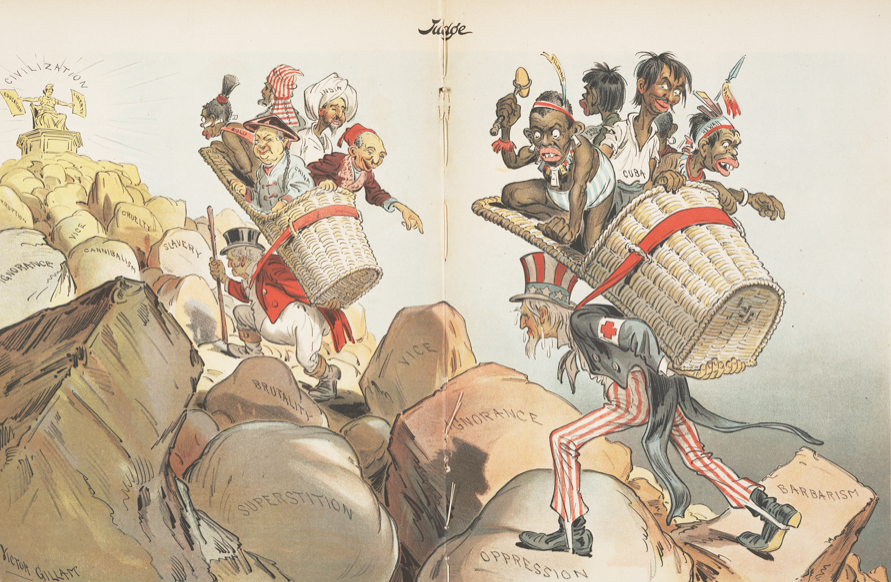
The editorial cartoon "'The White Man's Burden' (Apologies to Rudyard Kipling)" shows John Bull (U.K.) and Uncle Sam (U.S.) delivering the world's people of colour to civilization (Victor Gillam, Judge magazine, 1 April 1899). The people in the basket carried by Uncle Sam are labelled Cuba, Hawaii, Samoa, "Porto Rico", and Filipino, while the people in the basket carried by John Bull are labelled Zulu, China, India, "Soudan", and Egypt.

"The White Man's Burden" (1899), by Rudyard Kipling, is a poem about the Philippine–American War (1899–1902) that exhorts the United States to assume colonial control of the Filipino people and their country.

In "The White Man's Burden", Kipling encouraged the American annexation and colonisation of the Philippine Islands, a Pacific Ocean archipelago purchased in the three-month Spanish–American War (1898). As an imperialist poet, Kipling exhorts the American reader and listener to take up the enterprise of empire yet warns about the personal costs faced, endured, and paid in building an empire; nonetheless, American imperialists understood the phrase "the white man's burden" to justify imperial conquest as a civilising mission that is ideologically related to the continental expansion philosophy of manifest destiny of the early 19th century. With a central motif of the poem being the superiority of white men, it has long been criticised as a racist poem.

== History ==
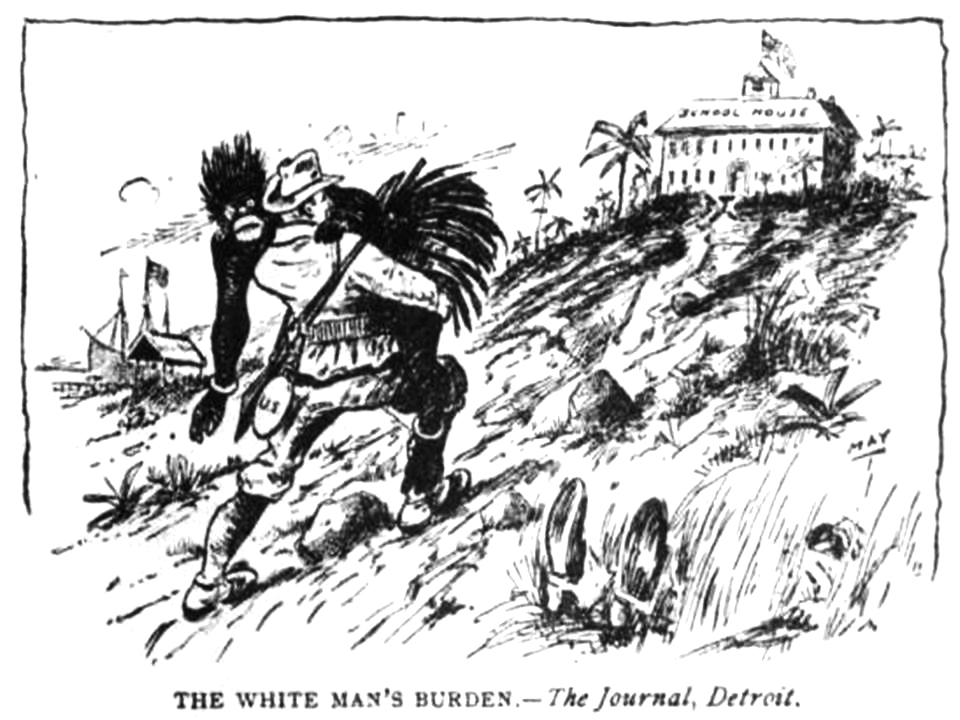
"The White Man's Burden" illustration (Detroit Journal, 1898)

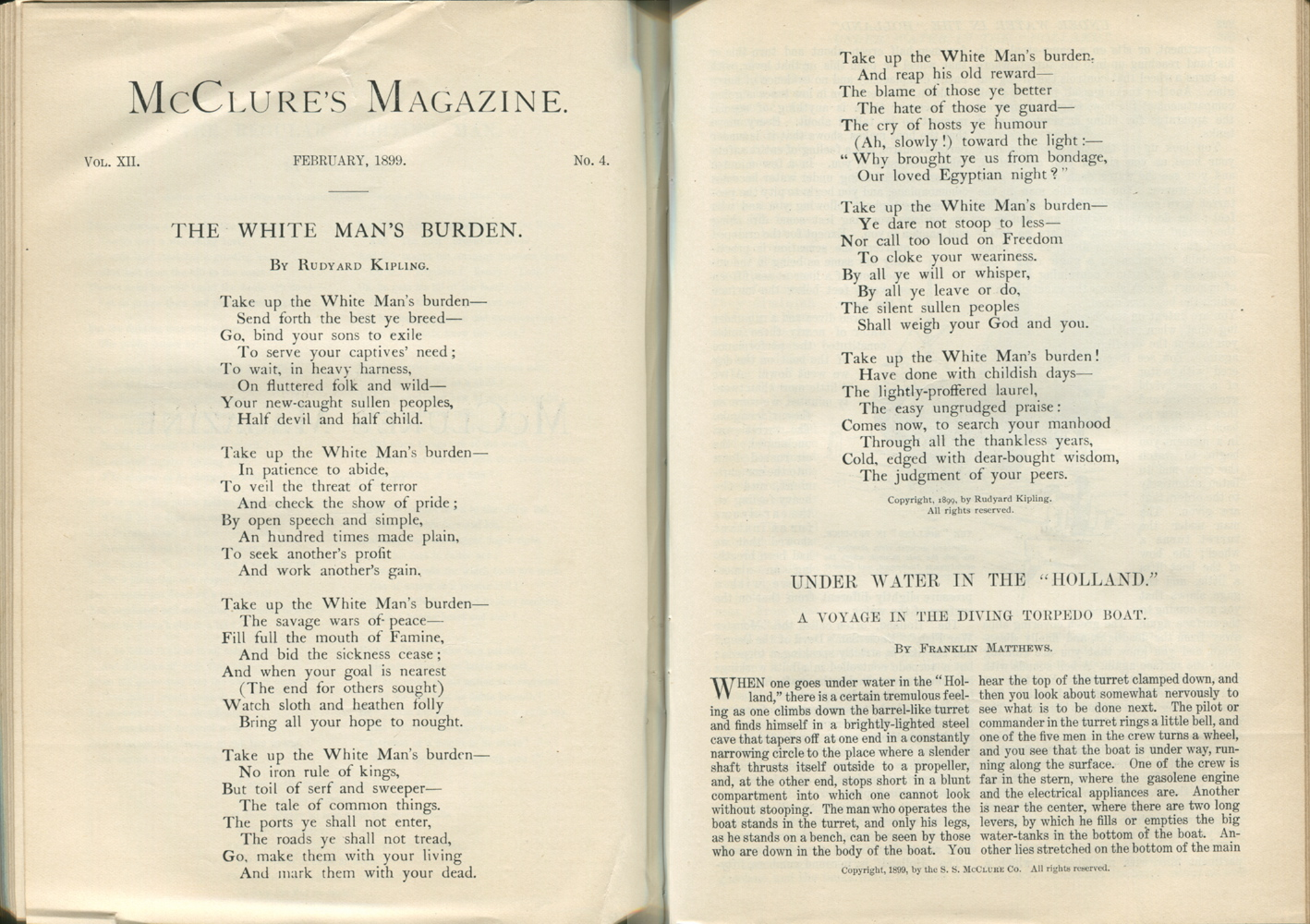
"The White Man's Burden" published in McClure's Magazine, February 1899

"The White Man's Burden" was first published in The New York Sun on 1 February 1899 and in The Times (London) on 4 February 1899. On 7 February 1899, during a senatorial debate to decide if the US should retain control of the Philippine Islands and the ten million Filipinos conquered from the Spanish Empire, Senator Benjamin Tillman read aloud the first, the fourth, and the fifth stanzas of Kipling's seven-stanza poem as arguments against ratification of the Treaty of Paris, and that the US should formally renounce claim of authority over the Philippine Islands. To that effect, Senator Tillman addressed the matter to President William McKinley:

As though coming at the most opportune time possible, you might say just before the treaty reached the Senate, or about the time it was sent to us, there appeared in one of our magazines a poem by Rudyard Kipling, the greatest poet of England at this time. This poem, unique, and in some places too deep for me, is a prophecy. I do not imagine that in the history of human events any poet has ever felt inspired so clearly to portray our danger and our duty. It is called "The White Man’s Burden." With the permission of Senators I will read a stanza, and I beg Senators to listen to it, for it is well worth their attention. This man has lived in the Indies. In fact, he is a citizen of the world, and has been all over it, and knows whereof he speaks.

He quotes, among other things, stanzas 1, 4, and 5 of "The White Man's Burden", noting:

Those [Filipino] peoples are not suited to our institutions. They are not ready for liberty as we understand it. They do not want it. Why are we bent on forcing upon them a civilization not suited to them and which only means in their view degradation and a loss of self-respect, which is worse than the loss of life itself?

Senator Tillman was unpersuasive, and the US Congress ratified the Treaty of Paris on 11 February 1899, formally ending the Spanish–American War. After paying a post-war indemnification of twenty million dollars to the Kingdom of Spain, on 11 April 1899, the US established geopolitical hegemony upon islands and peoples in two oceans and in two hemispheres: the Philippine Islands and Guam in the Pacific Ocean, and Cuba and Puerto Rico in the Atlantic Ocean.

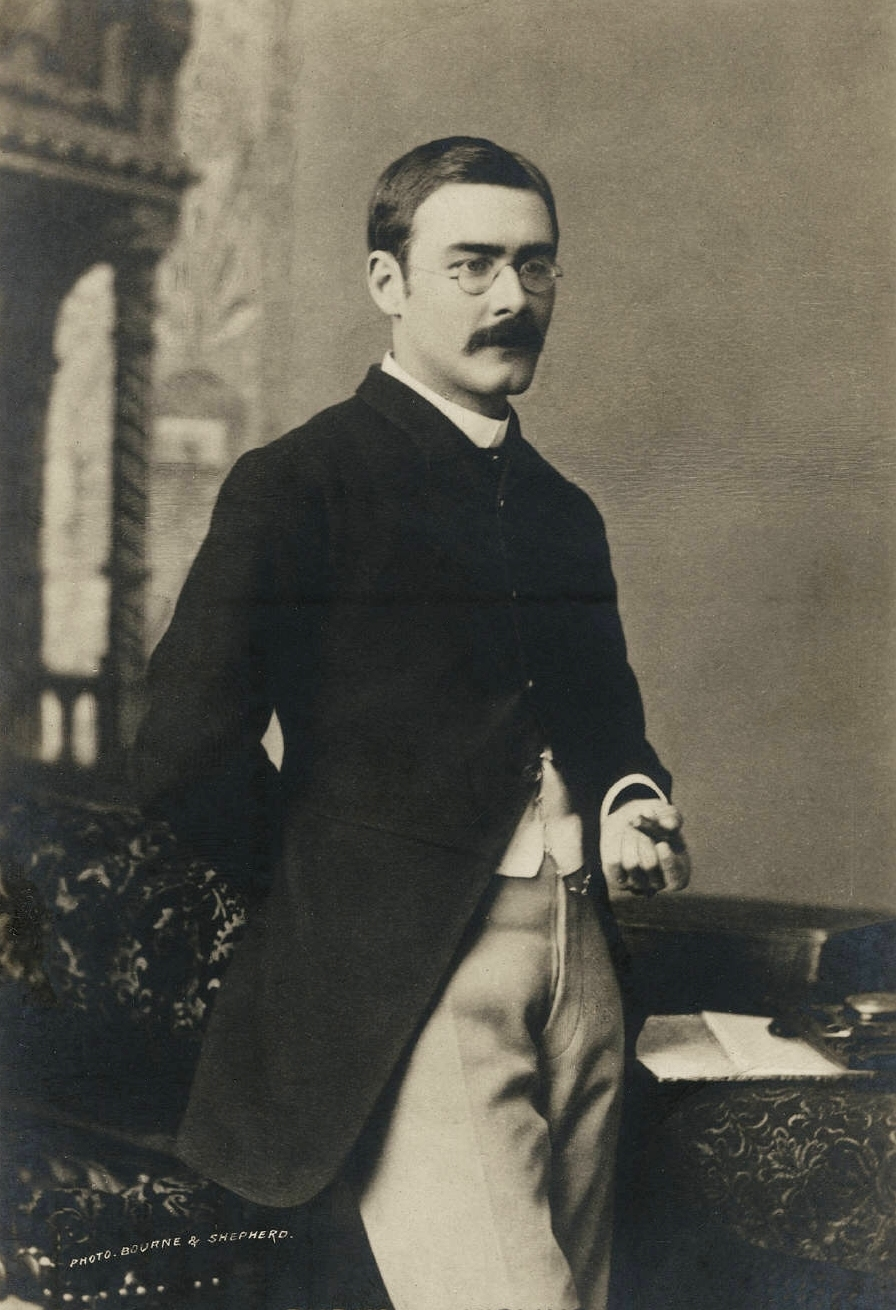
Rudyard Kipling in Calcutta, India (1892)

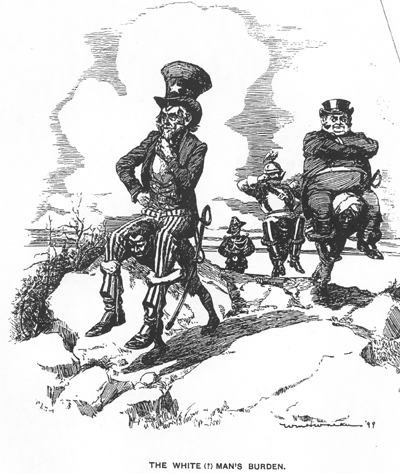
"The White (?) Man's Burden" shows the colonial exploitation of labour by various Western nations. (William Henry Walker, Life magazine, 16 March 1899)

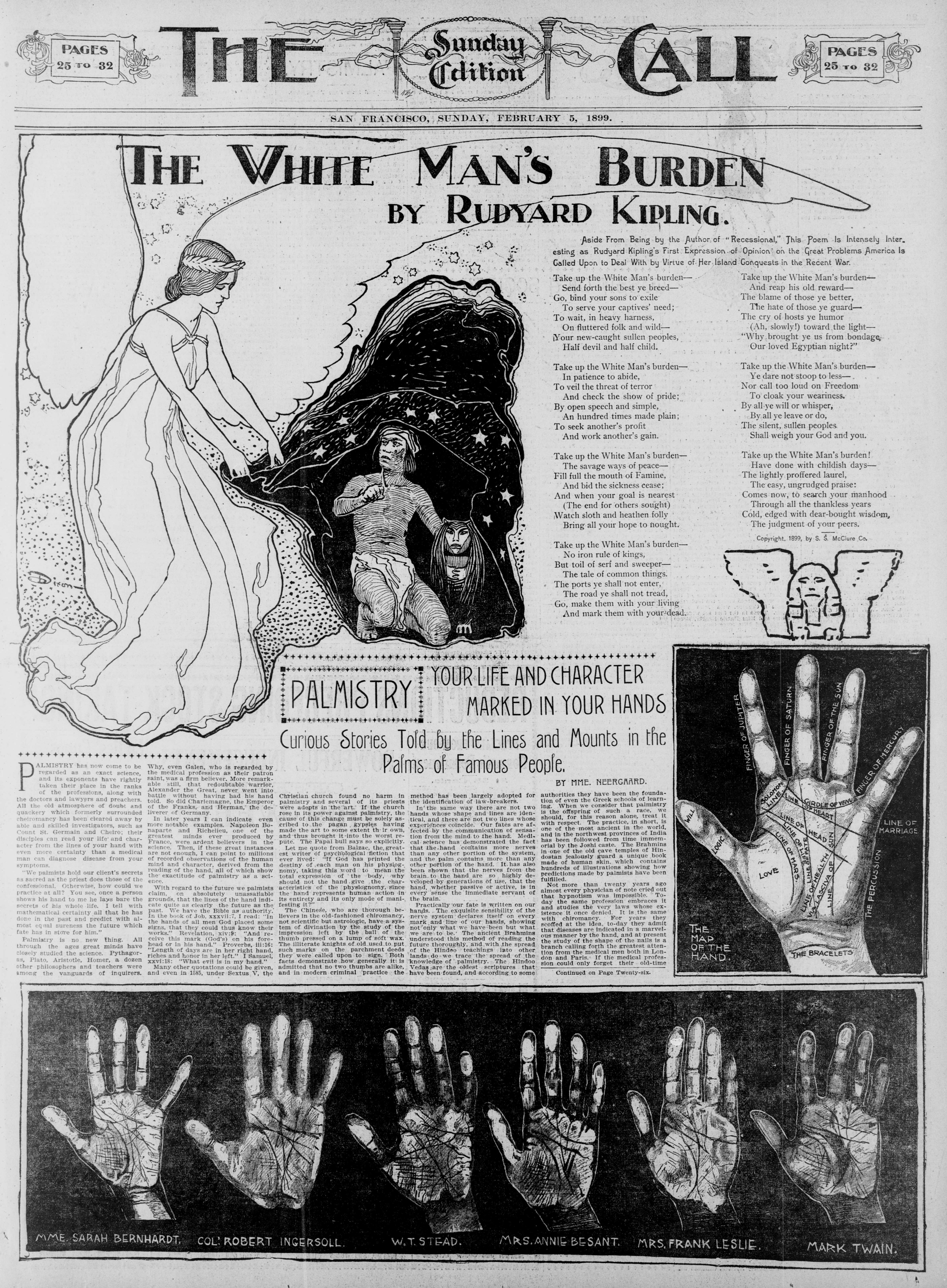
"The White Man's Burden" in The Call newspaper (San Francisco, 5 February 1899)

== Interpretation ==
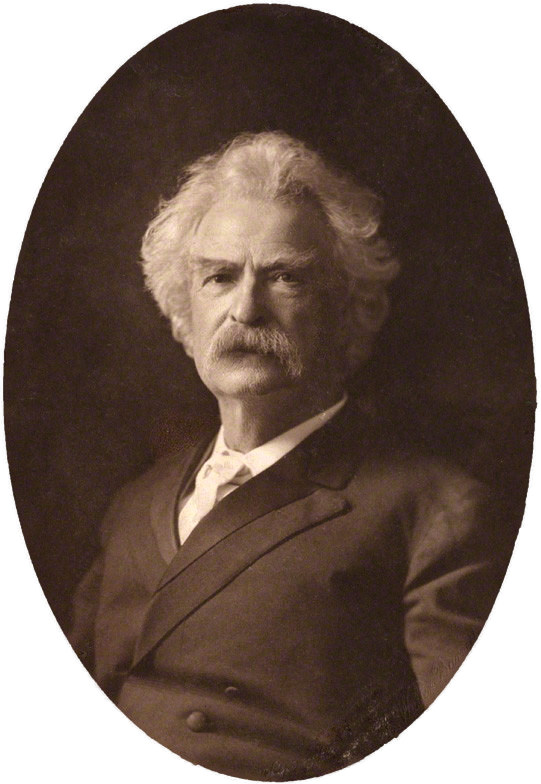
American writer Mark Twain replied to the imperialism Kipling espoused in "The White Man's Burden" with the satirical essay "To the Person Sitting in Darkness" (1901), about the anti-imperialist Boxer Rebellion (1899) in China.

The imperialist interpretation of "The White Man's Burden" proposes that the white race is morally obliged to civilise the non-white peoples of planet Earth, and to encourage their progress (economic, social, and cultural) through colonialism:

The implication, of course, was that the Empire existed not for the benefit — economic or strategic or otherwise — of Britain, itself, but in order that primitive peoples, incapable of self-government, could, with British guidance, eventually become civilized (and Christianized).

Kipling positively represents imperialism as the moral burden of the white race, who are divinely destined to "civilise" the brutish, non-white Other who inhabits the barbarous parts of the world; to wit, the seventh and eighth lines of the first stanza represent the Filipinos as "new-caught, sullen peoples, half-devil and half-child." Despite the chauvinistic nationalism that supported Western imperialism in the 19th century, public moral opposition to Kipling's racialist misrepresentation of the colonial exploitation of labour in "The White Man's Burden" produced the satirical essay "To the Person Sitting in Darkness" (1901), by Mark Twain, which catalogues the Western military atrocities of revenge committed against the Chinese people for their anti-colonial Boxer Rebellion against abusive Western businessmen and Christian missionaries.

Kipling politically proffered the poem to New York governor Theodore Roosevelt (in office 1899–1900) to help him persuade anti-imperialist Americans to accept the territorial annexation of the Philippine Islands to the United States. In September 1898, Kipling's literary reputation in the U.S. allowed his promotion of American empire to Governor Roosevelt:

Now, go in and put all the weight of your influence into hanging on, permanently, to the whole Philippines. America has gone and stuck a pick-axe into the foundations of a rotten house, and she is morally bound to build the house over, again, from the foundations, or have it fall about her ears.

As Victorian imperial poetry, "The White Man's Burden" thematically corresponded to Kipling's belief that the British Empire was the Englishman's "Divine Burden to reign God's Empire on Earth"; and celebrates British colonialism as a mission of civilisation that eventually would benefit the colonised natives. Roosevelt sent the poem to U.S. Senator Henry Cabot Lodge for his opinion and they agreed that it made "good sense from the expansion standpoint" for the American empire.

== Responses ==
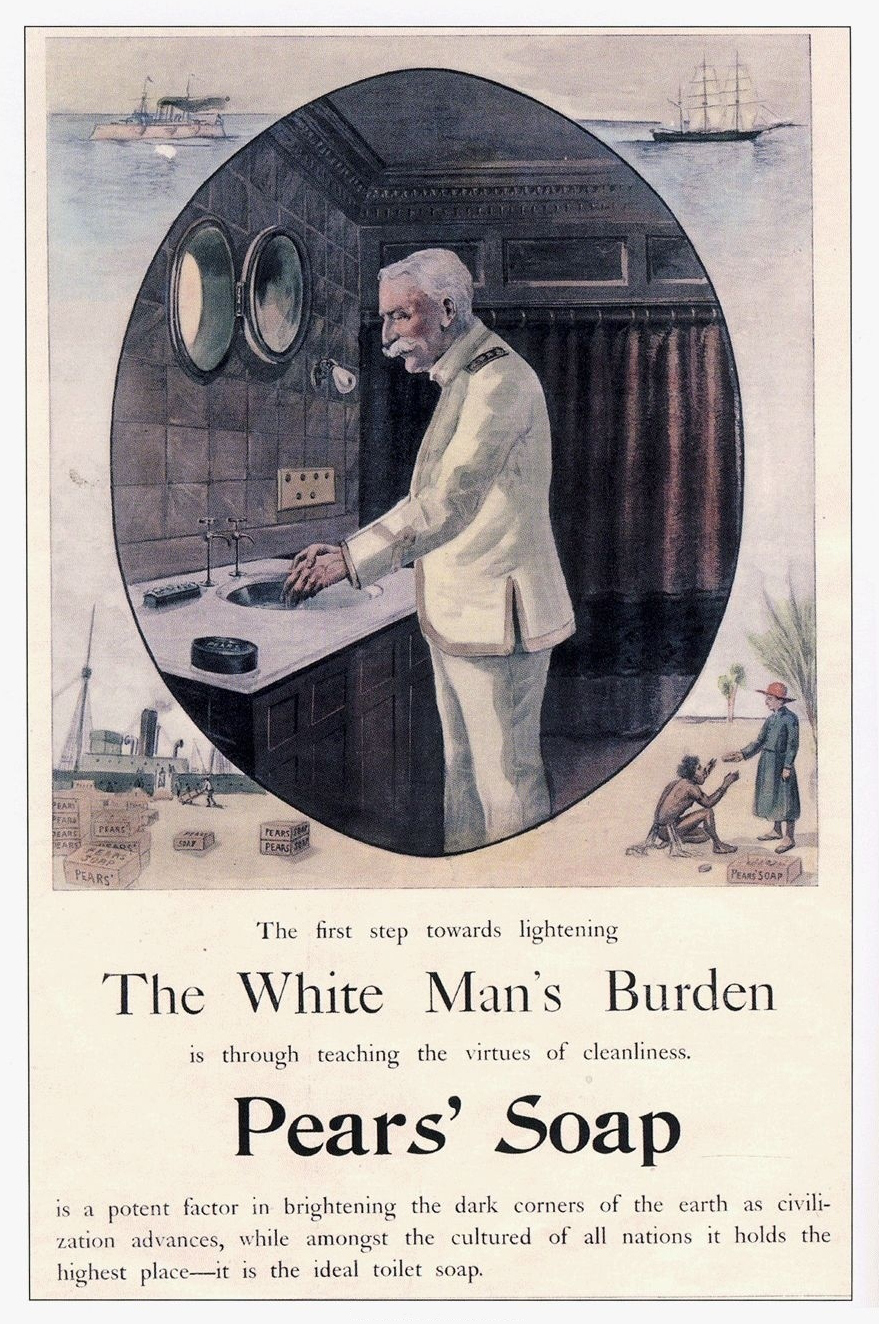
To the white man's burden, the civilising mission of colonialism includes teaching colonized people about soap, water, and personal hygiene. (1890s advert)

Shortly after the poem's publication, it was embraced but also harshly rejected. Rejections included Satan Absolved by Wilfred Scawen Blunt, a contemporary English poet.

Their poets who write big of the “White Burden.” Trash!

The White Man’s Burden, Lord, is the burden of his cash.

— Wilfred Scawen Blunt, Satan Absolved, page 44

In the early 20th century, in addition to To the Person Sitting in Darkness (1901), Mark Twain's factual satire of the civilising mission that is proposed, justified, and defended in "The White Man's Burden", contemporary opposition to Kipling's jingoism provoked poetic parodies that expressed anti-imperialist moral outrage, by critically addressing the particulars of white supremacist racism in colonial empires. Said responses include "The Brown Man's Burden" (February 1899), by British politician Henry Labouchère; "The Black Man's Burden: A Response to Kipling" (April 1899), by clergyman H. T. Johnson; and the poem Take Up the Black Man's Burden, by educator J. Dallas Bowser.

In the U.S., a Black Man's Burden Association demonstrated to Americans how the colonial mistreatment of Filipino brown people in their Philippine homeland was a cultural extension of the institutional racism of the Jim Crow laws for the legal mistreatment of black Americans in their US homeland. The popular response against Kipling's jingoism for an American Empire to annex the Philippine Islands as a colony impelled the establishment in June 1899 of the American Anti-Imperialist League in their political opposition to making colonial subjects of the Filipinos.

In The Poor Man's Burden (1899), Dr. Howard S. Taylor addressed the negative psycho-social effects of the imperialist ethos upon the working-class people in an empire. In the social perspective of "The Real 'White Man's Burden'" (1902), the reformer Ernest Crosby addresses the moral degradation (coarsening of affect) consequent to the practice of imperialism; and in The Black Man's Burden (1903), the British journalist E. D. Morel reported the Belgian imperial atrocities in the Congo Free State (1885–1908), which was an African personal property of King Leopold II of Belgium.

British writer Charles Beadle's novel, The Whiteman's Burden [sic] (London, 1912), set in 1905 Uganda during the sleeping sickness crisis, explores colonizer attitudes toward their responsibilities and native views of their presence.

In The Black Man's Burden, Morel identifies, describes, and explains that the metropole–colony power relations are established through cultural hegemony, which determines the weight of the black man's burden and the weight of the white man's burden in building a colonial empire "The Black Man's Burden (A Reply to Rudyard Kipling)" (1920), by social critic Hubert Harrison, described the moral degradation inflicted upon the colonised black people and the colonist white people.

In the decolonisation of the developing world, the phrase the white man's burden is synonymous with colonial domination, to illustrate the falsity of the good intentions of Western neo-colonialism toward the non-white peoples of the world. In 1974, President Idi Amin of Uganda sat atop a throne while forcing four white British businessmen to carry him through the streets of Kampala; as the businessmen groaned under the weight of Amin, he joked that this was "the new white man's burden".

== See also ==
- American exceptionalism
- American imperialism
- British imperialism
- Development theory
- Christian mission
- Civilizing mission
- Economic growth
- Economic inequality
- First World problem
- Global North and Global South
- Italian fascism and racism
  - "Faccetta nera"
  - "Manifesto of Race"
- Noble Savage
- Orientalism
- Rudyard Kipling bibliography
  - The Gods of the Copybook Headings (1919)
- The Tears of the White Man, by Pascal Bruckner
- The Tyranny of Guilt, by Pascal Bruckner
- Valladolid debate
- White savior
- "Yellow Peril"
- Spanish Filipinos

== General references ==
- Kipling, Rudyard (1903 [1899]). "The White Man's Burden" in The Five Nations. New York: Doubleday, Page, & Co.
  - The White Man's Burden public domain audiobook at LibriVox
- Cronin, Richard; Chapman, Alison; Harrison, Antony H., eds. (2002). A Companion to Victorian Poetry. Blackwell companions to literature and culture. Malden, Massachusetts: Blackwell Pub. ISBN 978-0-631-22207-1.
- Mama, Amina (1995). Beyond the Masks: Race, Gender, and Subjectivity. New York: Routledge. ISBN 978-0-415-03543-9.
- Murphy, Gretchen, ed. (2010). Shadowing the White Man's Burden: U.S. Imperialism and the Problem of the Color Line. America and the long 19th century. New York: New York University Press. ISBN 978-0-8147-9619-1.
