= White guilt (disambiguation) =

White guilt individual or collective guilt felt by some people concerning the harm from the racist treatment of people of color and ethnic minorities by white people both historically and presently.

White guilt may also refer to:

- White Guilt (book), a book by Shelby Steele
- "White Guilt" (song), a song by The Bronx
