= Western guilt =

Western guilt implies a failure of collective responsibility in the Western hemisphere and may refer to

- Western betrayal, prelude and aftermath of World War II
- White guilt, collective guilt
