= They Stole Our Beauty =

1997 novel by Pascal Bruckner

- Author: Pascal Bruckner
- Original title: Les Voleurs de beauté
- Translator: Stuart Bell
- Language: French
- Publisher: Éditions Grasset
- Publication date: 27 August 1997
- Publication place: France
- English publication date: 2019
- Pages: 291
- ISBN: 9782246493716

They Stole Our Beauty (French: Les Voleurs de beauté, lit. 'the beauty thieves') is a 1997 novel by the French writer Pascal Bruckner. The narrative is set in Paris during summer and follows several people who battle with desires and anxieties. The novel received the Prix Renaudot.

An English translation of the novel was published in 2019 under the title They Stole Our Beauty by British translator Stuart Bell.

== Reception ==
Marianne Payot of L'Express wrote: "Bruckner's miserable heroes continue their struggle with their unfulfilled desires, their vengeful sexuality and the withering of the time. Replaying the myth of Faust, they here embark in a macabre rocambolesque story where no one gets away unscathed. Once again, Bruckner, a shrewd observer, pinpoints the ambiguities of our society."
