= Bitter Moon =

1992 film by Roman Polanski

- Theatrical release poster
- Directed by: Roman Polanski
- Screenplay by: Roman Polanski; Gérard Brach; John Brownjohn
- Based on: Lunes de fiel by Pascal Bruckner
- Produced by: Roman Polanski
- Starring: Peter Coyote; Emmanuelle Seigner; Hugh Grant; Kristin Scott Thomas; Victor Banerjee
- Cinematography: Tonino Delli Colli
- Edited by: Hervé de Luze
- Music by: Vangelis
- Production companies: R.P. Productions; Timothy Burrill Productions; Les Films Alain Sarde; Canal+
- Distributed by: AMLF (France); Columbia Pictures (United Kingdom; through Columbia TriStar Film Distributors International)
- Release dates: 23 September 1992 (France); 2 October 1992 (United Kingdom)
- Running time: 139 minutes
- Countries: France; United Kingdom
- Languages: English; French
- Budget: £7 million
- Box office: £1.6 million (UK/US)

Bitter Moon is a 1992 erotic romantic black comedy thriller film co-written and directed by Roman Polanski. It stars Peter Coyote, Emmanuelle Seigner, Hugh Grant and Kristin Scott Thomas. The film's French title, Lunes de fiel, is a pun on the French phrase "lune de miel", meaning "honeymoon". It is based on the novel Lunes de fiel by French author Pascal Bruckner, published in English as Evil Angels. The score was composed by Vangelis.

== Plot ==
British couple Nigel and Fiona Dobson are on a Mediterranean cruise ship to Istanbul en route to India. They encounter a beautiful young French woman, Mimi, and that night, Nigel chats briefly with her in the ship's bar after seeing her dancing alone. Later, Nigel meets her much older and disabled American husband, Oscar Benton, who is a failed writer—acerbic, cynical and jaded.

Oscar invites Nigel to his cabin, where he tells Nigel in great detail how he and Mimi first met on a bus in Paris and fell passionately in love. Nigel relates all to Fiona. Both are appalled by Oscar's exhibitionism, but Nigel is also fascinated by Mimi, who provokes him. Oscar later narrates how they explored bondage, sadomasochism and voyeurism. As a contrast to their sexual adventurousness, Nigel and Fiona meet a distinguished Indian gentleman, Mr Singh, who is travelling with his little daughter Amrita. Singh assures the couple that "children are a better form of marital therapy than any trip to India."

Invited by Mimi, Nigel, escaping from a bridge game, goes to meet her in her cabin, only to find that she and Oscar have played a prank on him. Nigel wants to leave, but another session unfolds, with Oscar describing how their love–hate relationship developed. Bored, he tried to break up, but Mimi begged him to let her live with him under any conditions. He complied, but started to explore sadistic fantasies at her expense, humiliating her in public. When Mimi became pregnant, he made her have an abortion, saying that he would be a terrible father. When he visited her in hospital, he was shocked by her condition and almost relented in his attempts to drive her away. He promised her a holiday in the Caribbean, but he got off the plane just before takeoff. Mimi departed alone, crying.

Leaving Oscar's cabin, Nigel meets Mimi and they kiss. Afterwards, he finds Fiona in the bar flirting with a young man. She warns Nigel not to stray too far, and that anything he can do, she can do better. Nigel goes to Oscar, who continues his narration. After two years of parties and one-night stands, he drunkenly stepped in front of a vehicle by accident. To his surprise, Mimi came to visit him in the hospital where he was recovering from minor injuries and a fractured femur. Mimi shook hands with him, then pulled him out of his bed and left him hanging in his traction device, leaving him paraplegic. Oscar had no choice but to let Mimi move in with him again and take care of him. She revelled in dominating and humiliating him, seducing men in front of him. When Oscar was desperate and wanted to die, she gave him a gun as a birthday present. Having experienced highs and lows together, they realised they needed each other and actually got married.

Nigel clumsily tries to woo Mimi, encouraged and coached by Oscar. Things come to a head at the New Year's Eve party, when Fiona catches them dancing together. Fiona tells him that Oscar had persuaded her to come to the party. She proceeds to dance seductively with Mimi, which culminates in a passionate kiss, cheered on by the other partygoers. A stormy sea interrupts the party and the two women leave together. Nigel goes outside clutching a bottle of liquor and screams his frustration into the wind and waves.

Nigel finds Fiona in Oscar's cabin, sleeping naked beside Mimi. Oscar claims the women have had sex together. Nigel grabs his throat, but Oscar points a gun at him and he backs off. Oscar shoots the sleeping Mimi twice, then kills himself. While the bodies of Oscar and Mimi are being stretchered off the ship, Nigel and Fiona, shaken, embrace each other. Amrita then approaches to bid them farewell, and relays her father's wishes for a Happy New Year before departing.

== Cast ==
- Hugh Grant as Nigel Dobson
- Kristin Scott Thomas as Fiona Dobson
- Emmanuelle Seigner as Micheline "Mimi" Bouvier
- Peter Coyote as Oscar Benton
- Victor Banerjee as Mr Isaiah Singh
- Sophie Patel as Amrita Singh
- Luca Vellani as Dado
- Boris Bergman as Oscar's friend
- Olivia Brunaux as Cindy
- Heavon Grant as Basil
- Stockard Channing as Beverly (uncredited)

== Score ==
The film's score by Vangelis was never officially released for sale, although bootlegs of the music taken directly from the film itself have since been produced.

== Reception ==
On its release in Europe (in 1992) and North America (in 1994), Bitter Moon was a commercial failure and received mixed reviews from critics. Derek Elley of Variety commented that "Roman Polanski approaches rock bottom" and called the film "a phony slice of huis clos drama" with "a script that's all over the map and a tone that veers from outre comedy to erotic game-playing." Janet Maslin wrote in The New York Times: "Whatever else Mr. Polanski may be – nasty, mocking, darkly subversive in his view of the world – he definitely isn't dull. Bitter Moon is the kind of world-class, defiantly bad film that has a life of its own." A positive review came from Roger Ebert, who said "Polanski directs it without compromise or apology, and it's a funny thing how critics may condescend to it, but while they're watching it you could hear a pin drop." Time Out commented that "Polanski treats this slightly protracted tale of erotic obsession partly as deeply ironic black comedy", "rich and darkly disturbing" and "also wickedly entertaining." Reviewing the film in 2009, Scott Tobias wrote: "Bitter Moon is my favorite of the later-period Polanski films...nasty, potent, and psychologically knotty in a way that recalls the devil-may-care, enfant terrible Polanski of old." According to journalist Matthew Tempest, he and film director Christopher Nolan shared "a soft spot" for Bitter Moon as students.

On the review aggregator website Rotten Tomatoes, 64% of 36 critics' reviews are positive. Metacritic, which uses a weighted average, assigned the film a score of 62 out of 100, based on 28 critics, indicating "generally favorable" reviews.

It grossed £0.5 million in the United Kingdom and $1.9 million in the United States.

=== Year-end lists ===
- 5th – Jonathan Rosenbaum, Chicago Reader
- 7th – David Elliott, The San Diego Union-Tribune
- Top 10 (listed alphabetically, not ranked) – Matt Zoller Seitz, Dallas Observer
- Honorable mention – Howie Movshovitz, The Denver Post

== See also ==
- Sadism and masochism in fiction
