= Evil Angels (novel) =

1981 novel by Pascal Bruckner

Evil Angels is a 1981 novel by the French writer Pascal Bruckner. The French title is Lunes de fiel, which literally means "moons of bile", a pun on "lune de miel", "honeymoon". The story takes place on a passenger ship heading from Marseille to Istanbul, and focuses on a couple who meet a man determined to break them apart. The book was published by Éditions du Seuil. It was published in English in 1987, translated by William R. Beer.

It was adapted into the 1992 film Bitter Moon, directed by Roman Polanski.

== Reception ==
Kirkus Reviews described the book as "a dreary French novel of existential agony and absurdly serious erotica", and "laughable drivel disguised as a cynical, sophisticated love story". Publishers Weekly wrote: "The satire is biting and brilliant, proceeding in a tone that is sly and distanced, even philosophical as with the systematic discussion of six general categories of how to humiliate a woman. A bestseller in France, Evil Angels is a diabolical anatomy of lust in all its ramifications, with a plot that will keep readers enthralled."
