= The Temptation of Innocence =

1995 book by Pascal Bruckner

- Author: Pascal Bruckner
- Original title: La tentation de l'innocence
- Language: French
- Genre: Non-fiction
- Publication place: France
- English publication date: 2000

The Temptation of Innocence: Living in the Age of Entitlement (French: La tentation de l'innocence) is a 1995 book by the French philosopher Pascal Bruckner. Bruckner argues against contemporary trends of applying victimhood, real or imagined, to justify infantilisation, a lack of responsibility or even oppression of others. The book received the Prix Médicis essai. It was published in English in 2000.

== Reception ==
Publishers Weekly wrote:

Bruckner's European education, which he wears lightly; his unpreachy, aphoristic style; and his obvious delight in paradox save this book from the ranks of a tedious diatribe against permissiveness. Citings of Europe's philosophical and literary masters (Rousseau, Hegel, Nietzsche among many others) help Bruckner, who is French (this admirable translation is not, alas, credited), make the case that the modern individual, weakened by responsibilities of freedom too great to bear, finds freedom in weakness itself: the freedom from moral constraint. ... Bruckner should find a ready audience among philosophically inclined readers who bring a skeptical eye to contemporary trends and agree that freedom from responsibility is no freedom at all.
