= Stuart Bell (writer) =

British translator

Stuart Bell (born 1987) is a writer, editor and translator of French literature.

== Background ==
Stuart Bell was born in Hartlepool, County Durham. He sat A-levels in French, German, English and History, then read Modern Languages at Corpus Christi College, University of Cambridge. As an undergraduate, he wrote and performed in plays at the Corpus Playroom. He studied for a Master's degree at Birkbeck, University of London under film theorist Laura Mulvey, and later a PhD in French cinema at King's College London for a thesis entitled Co-stars as co-stagers.

Bell has translated novels, plays and poetry by francophone writers including Pascal Bruckner, Anne Goscinny, Édith Azam, Laura Doyle Péan and Emné Nasereddine. In addition to his writing on fiction in translation, Bell has published on French cinema, as well as reviewing books on European film.

He is also the founder and host of the podcast series 'The French Cinema Room'.

== Awards and honours ==
In 2022 Bell was shortlisted for the Oxford-Weidenfeld Translation Prize for his translation of Bird me.

Also in 2022 his translation of Yo-yo Heart was selected by the Poetry Book Society as their Winter Translation Choice.

== Publications ==
=== Edited books ===
2026 – (Ed. & M. Harrod & A. Phillips) French Cinema: Stardom, Gender and Popular Film (Legenda)

2024 – (Ed.) On Feminist Films (the87press)

2021 – (Ed.) Moving Impressions: Essays on Art and Experience (the87press)

=== Translated books ===
2023 – The Dance of the Fig Tree (by Emné Nasereddine, introduced by Stuart Bell)

2022 – Yo-yo Heart (by Laura Doyle Péan, introduced by Stuart Bell)

2021 – Bird me (by Édith Azam, introduced by Stuart Bell)

2020 – The Softest Sleep (by Anne Goscinny, introduced by Emma Wilson)

2019 – They Stole Our Beauty (by Pascal Bruckner)
