= What Killed Michael Brown? =

2020 documentary directed by Eli Steele

- Theatrical poster
- Directed by: Eli Steele
- Written by: Shelby Steele
- Produced by: Eli Steele
- Narrated by: Shelby Steele
- Cinematography: Eli Steele
- Release date: October 16, 2020
- Running time: 109 minutes
- Country: United States
- Language: English

What Killed Michael Brown? is a 2020 documentary film written and narrated by Black conservative author Shelby Steele and directed by his filmmaker son, Eli Steele. The film was released on October 16, 2020.

== Synopsis ==
The film addresses race relations in the United States through the 2014 shooting of Michael Brown in Ferguson, Missouri. The film states that "since the 60's, Whites have lived under the accusation that they are racist", and says that the documentary is a "true story" that "liberal mainstream media" does not want you to know.

== Production ==
Steele has opined that there is "poetic truth" concerning the death of Michael Brown. Steele said, "The language—he was 'executed,' he was 'assassinated,' 'hands up, don’t shoot'—it was a stunning example of poetic truth, of the lies that a society can entertain in pursuit of power." Steele additionally said, "In a microcosm, that’s where race relations are today. The truth has no chance. It’s smothered by the politics of victimization."

== Reception ==
Amazon initially rejected it for its streaming service, but later relented amid criticism.
