= The Divine Child (novel) =

1992 novel by Pascal Bruckner

- Author: Pascal Bruckner
- Original title: Le Divin enfant
- Translator: Joachim Neugroschel
- Language: French
- Publisher: Éditions du Seuil
- Publication date: 1992
- Publication place: France
- English publication date: 1994
- Pages: 243
- ISBN: 9782020132152

The Divine Child (French: Le Divin enfant) is a 1992 novel by the French writer Pascal Bruckner. It tells the story of twins who are educated while still in their mother's uterus and one of them ends up refusing to be born; he struggles with his mother and with God and eventually becomes a celebrity while still unborn. The book was published in English in 1994, translated by Joachim Neugroschel.

== Reception ==
Stewart M. Lindh wrote in Los Angeles Times, "What Pascal Bruckner, one of France's finest contemporary novelists, does in The Divine Child is to take us on a Candide-like journey into the world of neonatology". Lindh called the novel "no mere Gaelic version of Look Who's Talking, but a fierce satire of science gone wild".

Kirkus Reviews called the novel "A would-be Rabelaisian novel from French writer Bruckner (Evil Angels, 1987), who has an interesting idea -- defy death by refusing to be born -- but smothers it with gratuitously explicit sex, grotesque physical details, and old-hat intellectualism. ... One of those too-clever novels where the writer is more intent on strutting his stuff than telling a convincing tale."
