= The Tears of the White Man =

1983 book by Pascal Bruckner

- Author: Pascal Bruckner
- Original title: Le Sanglot de l'homme blanc
- Translator: William R. Beer
- Language: French
- Publisher: Éditions du Seuil
- Publication date: 1 May 1983
- Publication place: France
- English publication date: 1986
- Pages: 309
- ISBN: 9782020064910

The Tears of the White Man: Compassion as Contempt (French: Le Sanglot de l'homme blanc. Tiers-Monde, culpabilité, haine de soi) is a 1983 book by the French philosopher Pascal Bruckner. It describes how the political left of the Western world has a sentimental view of the Third World. Bruckner criticises this and how it is used to revel in self-hatred and perceived guilt. The book was published in English in 1986, translated by William R. Beer.

Roger Kimball regards Bruckner's 2006 book The Tyranny of Guilt as a sequel to The Tears of the White Man.

== Theme ==
Intellectual historian Richard Wolin described Tears of the White Man as "an unflinching attempt to come to grips with the conceit of Third Worldism... As the dreams of Soviet style Communism gradually soured, many on the left had transposed their allegiances to revolutionary insurgencies in the Southern Hemisphere: in Latin America, Africa, and Asia. They placed their chips on the virtue and the power of (Frantz Fanon's) 'the wretched of the earth.'"

== Reception ==
Kirkus Reviews wrote: "Throughout Bruckner's debate, the tone of vehement insensitivity to possible ether points of view is reminiscent of the most egoistic American political writers. But Bruckner, as a novelist, has much greater verbal resources than most political hacks. Unfortunately, most of this is lost in an inept translation: in most political books, a humdrum translation may suffice, but Bruckner is so dependent on a musketeer-like verbal flourish that only the best French translators should have attempted this job."

Writing in Foreign Affairs in 1987, Fritz Stern described the book as "a diatribe against the ideologues of Western guilt, against pious compassion with and exaltation of Third World countries" which "turns into a polemic, sometimes against straw men". Stern added, "Altogether, a book that by being contemptuous itself misses its own considerable potential".

== See also ==
- White guilt
