= Whites, Jews, and Us =

2016 book by Houria Bouteldja

Whites, Jews, and Us: Toward a Politics of Revolutionary Love
- French edition cover
- Author: Houria Bouteldja
- Original title: Les Blancs, les Juifs et nous: Vers une politique de l'amour révolutionnaire
- Translator: Rachel Valinsky
- Language: French
- Series: Semiotext(e) Intervention Series
- Release number: 22
- Publisher: La Fabrique Éditions, Semiotext(e)
- Publication date: 2016
- Publication place: France
- English publication date: 2017
- Media type: Print (paperback)
- Pages: 143 (French edition); 151 (English edition)
- ISBN: 9782358720816 (French edition)
- OCLC: 947036446

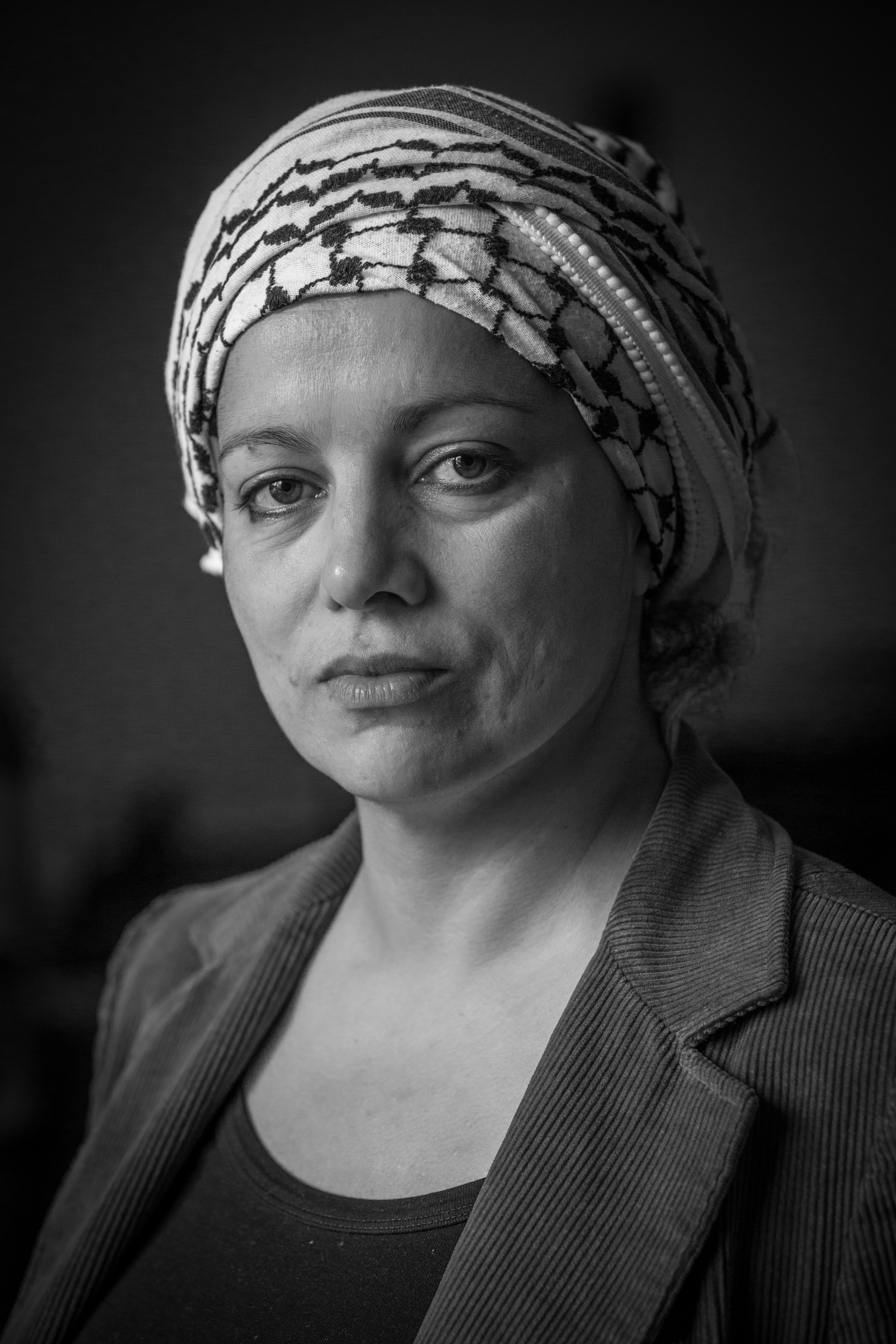
Houria Bouteldja, author of Whites, Jews and Us

Whites, Jews, and Us: Toward a Politics of Revolutionary Love (French: Les Blancs, les Juifs et nous: Vers une politique de l'amour révolutionnaire) is a 2016 book by the French-Algerian political activist Houria Bouteldja, first published in English in 2017.

== Background ==
Bouteldja, the daughter of Algerian immigrants who arrived in France in the 1960s, is a founding member and spokesperson of Le Parti des Indigènes de la République, a political movement which represents children of immigrants and promotes decolonial politics.

== Overview ==
The chapters that make up the first half of the book deal with questions of solidarity and invite self-reflection on the part of the reader. The first chapter deals with Israel by considering Jean-Paul Sartre's views on Israel and Palestinian self-determination, and the role of Israel in debates on the French left. Its title, "Shoot Sartre!", refers to a slogan used by French nationalists during the Algerian War. The second and third chapters then discuss Islamophobia and anti-Semitism in Europe with reference to the intersection of race and religion. The fourth chapter, addressed to European Jews, asks when and how the possibility of solidarity between Jews and Arabs was foreclosed and how this phenomenon relates to intra-Jewish racism in Israel. The final three chapters address women and people of colour in Europe and argue that solidarity between people of various genders, races, religions and sexualities is necessary to overcome white supremacy and patriarchy.

Bouteldja is critical of both white feminism and a variant of indigenous feminism that fails to trace the connections between masculine violence and western patriarchy. Bouteldja also criticises the doctrine of laïcité (secularism), which she sees as colluding with state racism.

The anthropologist Paul Silverstein has argued that Bouteldja's argument

boils down to a simple proposition, an offer which whites (les Blancs) cannot refuse if they wish to retain some level of bourgeois privilege and stave off the inevitable decolonial revolution: You give us love, we'll give you peace. Such a love is not reciprocal; it is one-sided. It requires that whites fully accept French men and women of colour and their struggles for freedom and equality as part and parcel of the (trans)national, decolonized "greater We" (le grand Nous). Such a love, she specifies, is not about the "heart" as a sentimental or spiritual figure, Islamic or otherwise. It is a love of political transformation.

== Critical reception and interpretation ==
=== French critics ===
Whites, Jews, and Us was denounced by French critics as anti-Semitic, misogynistic and homophobic. Ariane Pérez criticised Bouteldja's approach to issues of family, virility, race and religion, which she compared to those of the anti-Semitic journalist and writer Édouard Drumont. Roland Simon accused Bouteldja of "tactical homophobia, latent antisemitism, sympathizing with pro-Saddam [Hussein] elements during the Gulf War, scrapping women's struggles ('for the moment'), etc." Malika Amaouche, Yasmine Kateb, and Léa Nicolas-Teboul similarly rejected Bouteldja's conflation of Jewish people with the State of Israel.

The philosopher Ivan Segré describes Whites, Jews, and Us as at times "powerfully political and poetic", and praises Bouteldja's use of the concept of race as "not only irreproachable but indeed salutary", but criticises the book on several points. First, Segré accuses Bouteldja of effecting a "Copernican Revolution" in which Israel's right to exist is "the central question of politics" and one's position on Israel is prioritised above all else, to the extent that it determines one's place "on one side or the other of the firing squad." Segré argues that for Bouteldja "the question of 'the existence of Israel' is of a symbolic universalism disproportionate to empirical reality, at least if we admit that, in the history of imperialism from 1492 to today, Zionism – reprehensible or not – is a mere detail." Segré criticises Bouteldja's lack of interest in developments in Middle Eastern and North African politics that do not relate to Israel, from the Iran–Iraq War to the Syrian Civil War, and asks "In the heart of the whole world's 'natives' ... does the Israel question possess this extraordinary importance – or just in the heart of the author?" Segré also characterises Bouteldja's argument about feminism as "tenacious – and tenuous" and rejects her conclusion that feminist views amongst colonised people and people of colour are only the effects of colonial subjugation.

Thomas Guénolé, a member of the left-wing party La France Insoumise, accused Bouteldja of racism and anti-Semitism. An open letter signed by Ilan Pappé, Adi Ophir, Sylvère Lotringer, Ronit Lentin, Sarah Schulman, Ariella Azoulay and 14 others described Guénolé's accusations as "outrageous" and argued that he failed to understand either racism or anti-Semitism or to acknowledge Bouteldja's conception of "revolutionary love".

Ben Ratskoff described the response to Whites, Jews, and Us as a "veritable lynching" and compared it to the censorship of the literary magazine Tropiques by the Vichy government in 1943.

In a letter signed by Christine Delphy, Annie Ernaux, Catherine Samary, Isabelle Stengers and 16 others, published in Le Monde in June 2017, the authors accused Bouteldja's critics of character assassination and of having failed to read Whites, Jews, and Us beyond the title "or at most a few misrepresented citations." The authors continue:

The hatred that Houria Bouteldja arouses is commensurate with her courage. The courage to shake up our worthy consciences when we prefer to forget what we gain from being whites, here in the West. The courage to evoke racialised women's day-to-day fight and decolonial feminists' struggle. A resolute and indefinite refusal to fall into the essentialism of the "indigenous man," which so opportunely masks the violence everywhere done to women throughout our societies.

The authors conclude that Bouteldja's call for "revolutionary love" indicates that she does not prioritise questions of race over "the social question", and constitutes "a resounding appeal to break out of our exclusivisms, to abandon our separations and our barriers."

The Italian historian Enzo Traverso argues that accusations of anti-Semitism are based on taking passages from Whites, Jews, and Us out of context, and described the book as "a very personal, intimate work, a deftly written text that is also very political: it is a provocation, in the best sense of the word." Traverso concurs with Bouteldja's argument that questions of race are still relevant in 21st-century France, and locates the roots of her argument in the lack of social change experienced since the 1983 March for Equality and Against Racism. Traverso criticises Bouteldja, however, for homogenising her central racial categories: he argues that her treatment of Islam as "a monolithic bloc" ignores the Arab Spring and Islamic terrorism, and so recalls Samuel P. Huntington's "clash of civilisations" thesis, while her understanding of white people as a "homogenous category" ignores the history of various definitions of whiteness in the United States and beyond, especially as they pertain to the status of Italian people.

=== Anglophone responses ===
Ratskoff, writing in the Los Angeles Review of Books, describes the book as "a passionate and poetic manifesto" characterised by "a bracing optimism, making a magnificent appeal for a metropolitan decolonial movement as a political force for liberation." In Ratskoff's reading, "Bouteldja's vision is ... remarkably inclusive", implying the possibility of decolonial solidarity with Jewish Zionists and the white working class. Ratskoff nonetheless questions the absence of indigenous lesbians and indigenous queerness from Bouteldja's analysis, and suggests that her argument about the intersection of gender and racism risks reanimating "the patriarchal politics of midcentury civil rights movements that subordinated the double oppression faced by black women to the concerns of the black male leadership."

Anya Topolski describes Whites, Jews, and Us as "painfully confronting, for whites, feminists and Jews, and refreshingly frank." Sarah Marusek characterises Bouteldja's style as "intimately self-reflexive, somewhere between an autoethnography and a diary", but asks whether her "poetic, honest, and self-reflexive" writing can appeal to readers beyond those who already agree with the book's argument. Marusek praises Bouteldja's "positioning of love both beyond and entrenched within the injustice of today’s world" and her rejection of essentialism, and concludes that the argument "that revolutionary love is fundamental to the decolonial project is both bold and inspired."

Writing in the New Humanist, Keith Kahn-Harris describes Whites, Jews, and Us as "A sometimes thrilling polemic," but also identified "a frightening absolutism" in its treatment of Jewish people and its depiction of "A world in which there is only one power in the world, white western power, and where the barrier between power and powerlessness is absolute until it is breached by revolution."

In his introduction to Segré's review, Ross Wolfe describes Whites, Jews, and Us as "a poetic, almost literary text, more manifesto than treatise".

==== The Immanent Frame ====
In 2018 The Immanent Frame published a forum on Whites, Jews, and Us. In his introductory essay, Jared Sexton argues that in examining the function (rather than simply evaluating the status) of the rights afforded in liberal democracies, Bouteldja's work is aligned with that of the Peruvian sociologist Aníbal Quijano and other theorists of the "coloniality of power". In Sexton's reading,

Bouteldja is interested in returning a sense of verticality to analyses of power, not only between the top and the bottom, the haves and the have-nots, but also among those excluded, by differences of degree and of kind, from the commanding heights, a stratigraphy of being and value.

Sexton rejects criticisms of Bouteldja made by other indigenous feminists, according to which she is an apologist for gender violence amongst communities of colour, and argues that she instead "refuses to accuse [these phenomena] just as much as she refuses to excuse [them]."

In his essay on Bouteldja's prose, Yassir Morsi argues that the form of Whites, Jews, and Us "is inseparable from its content" and praised Bouteldja's "raw and honest voice". Morsi suggests that readers "get caught in the rhythm of her writing even if we are not always certain of what she means." He describes the book as an example of autoethnography in its incorporation of Bouteldja's personal experience and circumvention of "disembodied discussions of what Islam is or is not", and concludes that Whites, Jews, and Us is a "powerful, touching, dignified work".

Santiago Slabodsky's contribution to the Immanent Frame forum foregrounds Bouteldja's discussion of the Bandung Conference. In 2018 Bouteldja and others organised a conference entitled "Bandung of the North", which sought to strengthen resistance to "the patterns of racial, sexual, economical, and epistemological domination developed during colonial times in colonial locations that transcended their contexts by being reproduced globally up to the present day"; Slabodsky suggests that Whites, Jews, and Us "offers us a glimpse of the Bandung of the North potentialities." Slabodsky discusses the function of the book in academic contexts and finds that it "transcends the limits of academic inquiry", but this does not mean "that academics have the luxury of ignoring Bouteldja", who "offers tools to broaden the networks of resistance disrupting not only the criminality of the West, but also the complicities of her/our own communities".

Joëlle Marelli interprets the response to Whites, Jews, and Us (in which it was perceived "as anti-white, anti-Semitic, sexist, and homophobic") as in keeping with a broader French rejection of communautarisme (communitarianism) as signalling "political immaturity". Marelli reads Bouteldja alongside debates on these themes in the work of Hannah Arendt, James Baldwin and Gershom Scholem, and concludes that the invocation of "revolutionary love" found in Whites, Jews, and Us as well as in works by Baldwin and C. L. R. James constitutes (in Jacques Rancière's terminology) "the horizon of a new political subjectivation."

In an expanded version of the same piece in b2o: an online journal, Marelli addressed the controversy surrounding the book in greater depth, and described criticisms of the book as "mired in the felt need to attend to prejudices entertained and nourished by mainstream media against what the Indigènes de la République ... stand for." Marelli continues: "Any attempt to show that equality doesn’t exist in France causes malicious backlash. Any endeavour to think about race, religion, and gender in terms that vary from the prescribed institutional frameworks ... is an opportunity for abuse." Marelli argues that revolutionary love "is not the demand for love, nor is it 'Christian love', nor loving one's neighbor nor one's enemy." Instead, "It is a disidentifying transformation, a political subjectification that operates at the moment where equality is affirmed." Concluding, Marelli identifies as "the book's most precious lesson" the insight

that every member of a pariah group must not only choose between being a rebel and being 'responsible for his/her own oppression', but must also find the means to escape from the affective negativity engendered by his/her condition. To that end there are only two possible paths: revolutionary violence or revolutionary love.

Nazia Kazi notes that Bouteldja speaks from a liminal position, "between black and white, global north and south, innocence and guilt." Kazi reads Whites, Jews, and Us as a challenge to dominant conceptions of white supremacy, which Kazi argues Bouteldja understands as a relational concept rather than an objective one: "Whiteness and blackness only exist in their relation to one another and to processes of capitalist exploitation and imperialist violence." Kazi argues that the controversy around the book occurred "because it was unapologetic, marked with none of the lilting softness demanded of us when we speak about race, marked with no quarter for white fragility nor concern for whom it might offend." Concluding, Kazi interprets Bouteldja's concept of "revolutionary love" "as an invitation to whites to practice the solidarity of Jean Genet and, I would add, of John Brown and the Young Patriots."

Joshua Dubler reads Whites, Jews, and Us in terms of its categories of "we" and "you", or self and other, neither of which "is unitary or discrete." The porosity of these categories, in Dubler's reading, is a political necessity and is constitutive of "revolutionary love". Dubler praises Bouteldja's "joyful spirit" and the "mischievous fashion" in which the book's argument is articulated, and argues that "Whites, Jews, and Us shows the reader an exceedingly good time." Dubler proclaims his allegiance to Bouteldja's "we", but questions her two "yous" ("whites" and "Jews"), who, he argues, are both included via a demand for solidarity, and excluded. Dubler argues that in the American context, "The hailing of white people as white people" has lost its political resonance, as

To heed the call is to establish one's bona fides as the exception to the rule. Those who embrace these objectifications find absolution in their confession, and thereby exempt themselves from the charge. The relevant white people are always to be found elsewhere. To put it crudely: for years now, my social media feeds have been full of white people railing against "white people."

Dubler asks whether Bouteldja's representation of Jewish people as obsequious "internal others" who have accepted Zionism, which he views as cutting against Jewish tradition, downplays the presence of non-Zionist Jews. "Instead of surrendering Judaism to Holocaust covetousness, Zionism, and ADL-style paranoia," Dubler suggests, "if Bouteldja truly wants Jews to go in for revolutionary love, she would be better served by signal boosting the righteous and crazy alternative."

In his essay in The Immanent Frame Gil Anidjar writes:

Bouteldja ... makes a scene, wakes us up, and writes a book that ought to affect us like a disaster, like the disasters she recalls and announces. Bouteldja performs a remarkable gesture.... Bouteldja speaks to us like one of those books we need, one of these books that wake us up with a blow to the head.

Anidjar argues that "Bouteldja undoubtedly initiates a dialogue, a different kind of dialogue, with no condescension, no unilateral, pseudo-parental pedagogy from on high" and suggests that the reader is obliged to formulate a response to Bouteldja's argument or to the "trajectory" out of which it emerges.

Su'ad Abdul Khabeer compares Bouteldja's discussion of France to the treatment of the United States in the work of the literary critic Hortense Spillers and argues that "both theorists challenge the casting of colonized people as peripheral or ancillary to the modern nation-state, and to modernity as a whole." Abdul Khabeer praises Bouteldja's treatment of issues specific to the African diaspora and identifies her as one of a number of thinkers who reject secularism and the idea that secularism is neutral or innocent.

== Publication history ==
- Les Blancs, les Juifs et nous: Vers une politique de l'amour révolutionnaire. Paris: La Fabrique Éditions. 2016. ISBN 9782358720816. OCLC 947036446.
- Whites, Jews, and Us: Toward a Politics of Revolutionary Love. Semiotext(e) Intervention Series 22. South Pasadena, California: Semiotext(e). 2017. ISBN 9781635900033. OCLC 1027566314.

== See also ==
- Algerians in France
- Immigration to France
- Racism in France
