= Shelby Steele =

American academic

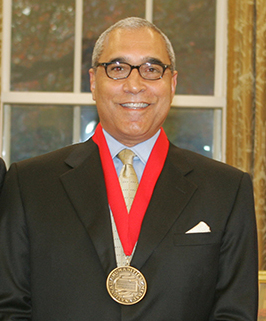
- Steele receiving the National Medal of the Humanities in 2004
- Born: January 1, 1946 (age 80); Chicago, Illinois, U.S.
- Education: Coe College (BA); Southern Illinois University, Edwardsville (MA); University of Utah (PhD)

Shelby Steele (born January 1, 1946) is an American author, columnist, documentary film maker, and a Robert J. and Marion E. Oster Senior Fellow at Stanford University's Hoover Institution. He specializes in the study of race relations, multiculturalism, and affirmative action.

== Early life and education ==
Steele was born in Phoenix, Illinois, a Cook County village off Chicago's South Side, to a black father and a white mother. His father, Shelby Sr., a truck driver with a third-grade education, and his mother, Ruth, a social worker, were founding members of the Congress of Racial Equality (CORE). Steele attended an all-black elementary school. His paternal grandfather was born a slave in Kentucky. His twin brother is Claude Steele, a professor emeritus of psychology at Stanford University, who held leadership positions with UC Berkeley, Columbia University and Stanford.

Steele received a B.A. in political science from Coe College, an M.A. in sociology from Southern Illinois University Edwardsville, and a Ph.D. in English from the University of Utah.

Steele spent 20 years as an English professor at San Jose State University.

== Career ==
Steele has been called a black conservative. He opposes policies such as affirmative action, which he considers to be unsuccessful liberal campaigns to promote equal opportunity for African Americans. He contends that blacks have been "twice betrayed:" first by slavery and oppression and then by group preferences mandated by the government, which discourage self-agency and personal responsibility in blacks.

The great ingenuity of interventions like affirmative action has not been that they give Americans a way to identify with the struggle of blacks, but that they give them a way to identify with racial virtuousness quite apart from blacks.

Steele believes that the use of victimization is the greatest hindrance for black Americans. In his view, white Americans see blacks as victims to ease their guilty conscience, and blacks attempt to turn their status as victims into a kind of currency that will purchase nothing of real or lasting value. Therefore, he claims, blacks must stop "buying into this zero-sum game" by adopting a "culture of excellence and achievement" without relying on "set-asides and entitlements."

=== Barack Obama ===
Steele wrote a short book, A Bound Man: Why We Are Excited About Obama and Why He Can't Win, published in December 2007. The book contained Steele's analysis of Barack Obama's character as a child born to a mixed couple who then had to grow as a black man. Steele concluded that Obama is a "bound man" to his "black identity." Steele gives this description of his conclusion:

There is a price to be paid even for fellow-traveling with a racial identity as politicized and demanding as today's black identity. This identity wants to take over a greater proportion of the self than other racial identities do. It wants to have its collective truth—its defining ideas of grievance and protest—become personal truth.... These are the identity pressures that Barack Obama lives within. He is vulnerable to them because he has hungered for a transparent black identity much of his life. He needs to 'be black.' And this hunger—no matter how understandable it may be—means that he is not in a position to reject the political liberalism inherent in his racial identity. For Obama liberalism is blackness.

After Obama won the 2008 U.S. presidential election, Steele defended the content of the book and claimed its subtitle was a marketing device motivated by the publisher which he came up with "in about 30 seconds." He explains Obama's victory by likening him to Louis Armstrong who donned the "bargainer's mask" in his bid for white acceptance. In his analysis, he takes whites, whom he claims have for decades been stigmatized as racist and had to prove they are not, "off the hook."

On Uncommon Knowledge, an interview program for the Hoover Institute hosted by Peter Robinson, he said: "White America has made tremendous moral progress since the '60s.... And they've never given themselves credit for that. And here is an opportunity at last to document this progress."

=== On Israel ===
Steele has been critical of what he describes as the "world opinion" of Israel.

At every turn "world opinion," like a schoolmarm, takes offense and condemns Israel for yet another infraction of the world's moral sensibility. And this voice has achieved an international political legitimacy so that even the silliest condemnation of Israel is an opportunity for self-congratulation. Rock bands now find moral imprimatur in canceling their summer tour stops in Israel (Elvis Costello, the Pixies, the Gorillaz, the Klaxons). A demonstrator at an anti-Israel rally in New York carries a sign depicting the skull and crossbones drawn over the word "Israel." White House correspondent Helen Thomas, in one of the ugliest incarnations of this voice, calls on Jews to move back to Poland. And of course the United Nations and other international organizations smugly pass one condemnatory resolution after another against Israel while the Obama administration either joins in or demurs with a wink.

== Controversies ==
=== What Killed Michael Brown? ===
What Killed Michael Brown? is a documentary film written and narrated by Shelby Steele and directed by his filmmaker son, Eli Steele, which was scheduled to premiere on October 16, 2020. It addresses race relations in the United States and in particular an incident in Ferguson, Missouri, in 2014 involving Michael Brown. Steele has opined that there is "poetic truth" concerning the death of Michael Brown. Steele said: "The language—he was 'executed,' he was 'assassinated,' 'hands up, don't shoot'—it was a stunning example of poetic truth, of the lies that a society can entertain in pursuit of power." Steele additionally said: "In a microcosm, that's where race relations are today. The truth has no chance. It's smothered by the politics of victimization." Amazon initially rejected it for its Amazon Prime Video streaming service but later relented after coming under fire from op-eds in The Wall Street Journal and other publications.

== Personal life ==
Steele met his wife, Rita Silverman, while they were students at Coe. They both met at an meeting of the SCOPE Project, where Steele was active. They have two children together, Eli Steele and Loni Steele Sosthand.

== Bibliography ==
External videos
- Presentation by Steele on The Content of Our Character, February 14, 1997, C-SPAN
- Presentation by Steele on A Dream Deferred, October 22, 1998, C-SPAN
- Booknotes interview with Steele on A Dream Deferred, December 6, 1998, C-SPAN
- Presentation by Steele on A Bound Man, January 18, 2008, C-SPAN
- Interview with Steele on Shame, July 20, 2017, C-SPAN

=== Books ===
- The Content of Our Character: A New Vision of Race in America. Harper Perennial. 1991. ISBN 0-06-097415-X.
- A Dream Deferred: The Second Betrayal of Black Freedom in America. Harper Perennial. 1998. ISBN 0-06-093104-3.
- White Guilt: How Blacks and Whites Together Destroyed the Promise of the Civil Rights Era. HarperCollins. 2006. ISBN 0-06-057862-9.
- A Bound Man: Why We Are Excited About Obama and Why He Can't Win. HarperCollins. 2007. ISBN 978-1-4165-5917-7.
- Shame: How America's Past Sins Have Polarized Our Country. Basic Books. 2015. ISBN 978-0-4650-6697-1.

=== Documentary films ===
- (narrator) (1990-05-11). "Seven Days in Bensonhurst". Frontline. PBS. WGBH, Boston. Archived from the original on October 6, 2003.
- (writer, narrator) (2000-05-02). "Jefferson's Blood". Frontline. PBS. WGBH, Boston.
- What Killed Michael Brown. 16 October 2020.

== Awards ==
- National Book Critics Circle Award (1990) in the general non-fiction category for the book The Content of Our Character.
- Emmy and Writers Guild Awards for his 1991 Frontline documentary film Seven Days in Bensonhurst.
- National Medal of the Humanities, 2004.

== See also ==
- Black conservatism in the United States
