= Houria Bouteldja =

French-Algerian political activist (born 1973)

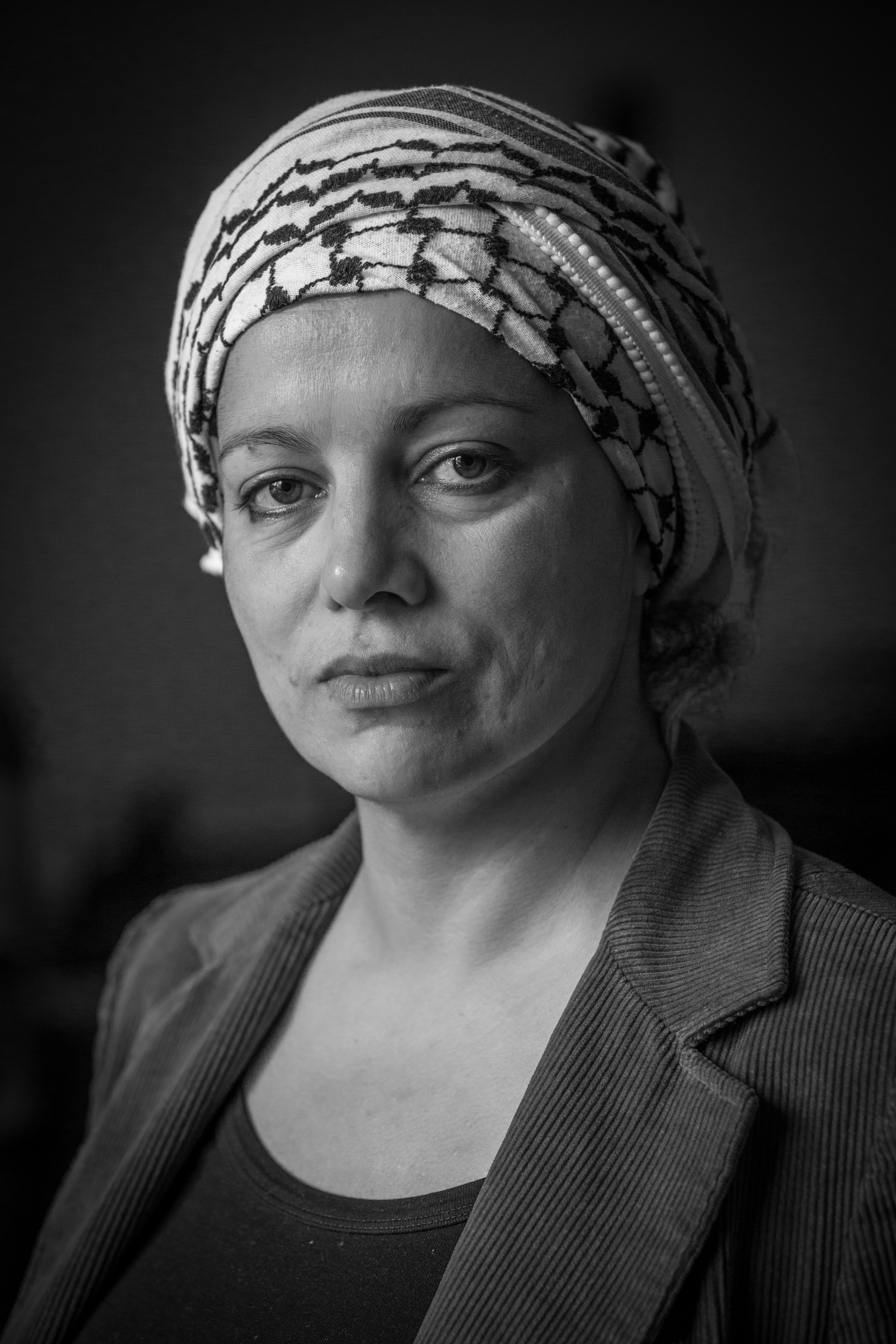
A 2016 photograph of Houria Bouteldja

Houria Bouteldja (French pronunciation: [uʁja butɛldʒa], Arabic: حورية بوتلجة; born January 5, 1973) is a French-Algerian political activist. She served as spokesperson for the Indigènes de la République until 2020.

== Life ==
Born in Constantine, Algeria, on 5 January 1973, Houria Bouteldja emigrated with her parents to France as a child. She studied applied foreign languages in English and Arabic in Lyon. From 2001, she worked for the Institut du Monde Arabe.

She first took part in the Collectif Une école pour tou-te-s (CEPT). In 2004, in reaction to the speech of Le mouvement ni putes ni soumises, she founded "les Blédardes", a movement positioning itself against the ban on the veil in schools, and defining a "paradoxical feminism of solidarity with the men" of her community.

The Indigènes de la République organized as a movement to denounce France's colonial past, to fight against the discrimination suffered by the "descendants of colonized populations" and, more broadly, against the racist and colonialist ideology which they argue underpins the current social policies of the French state.

On 24 October 2012, she was sprayed with paint by a man in front of the Institut du Monde Arabe, an action claimed the next day by the Jewish Defense League (LDJ), already implicated in two similar attacks. She lodged a complaint and her attacker, the webmaster of the LDJ, was sentenced in May 2016 to a 6-month suspended prison sentence and a fine of €8,500.

In 2014, she won the "combat against Islamophobia" prize from the Islamic Human Rights Commission.

== Whites, Jews, and Us ==
Bouteldja is the author of Les Blancs, les Juifs et nous: Vers une politique de l'amour révolutionnaire (2016), translated into English in 2017 as Whites, Jews, and Us: Toward a Politics of Revolutionary Love. The book considers questions of solidarity, Jean-Paul Sartre's views on Israel and Palestinian self-determination, Islamophobia and anti-Semitism in Europe, the foreclosure of the possibility of solidarity between Jews and Arabs, and the status of women and people of colour in Europe.

== Political positions ==
Described as an anti-racist activist, and presenting herself as committed to the fight against Islamophobia and neocolonialism, Houria Bouteldja has been the subject of numerous criticisms and has been accused of identity politics drift.

== Works ==
- With Sadri Khiari, Félix Boggio Éwanjé-Épée et Stella Magliani-Belkacem, Nous sommes les indigènes de la République, Paris, Amsterdam, 2012, 435 pp. + VIII (ISBN 978-2-35480-113-7)
- Les Blancs, les Juifs et nous : vers une politique de l'amour révolutionnaire, Paris, La Fabrique, 2016, 143 pp. (ISBN 978-2-35872-081-6)
- Beaufs et barbares : Le pari du nous, Paris, La Fabrique, 2023, 270 pp. (ISBN 978-2-35872-250-6)
