= White Guilt (book) =

2006 book by Shelby Steele

White Guilt: How Blacks and Whites Together Destroyed the Promise of the Civil Rights Era
- First edition
- Author: Shelby Steele
- Genre: Non-fiction
- Publisher: HarperCollins
- Publication date: 2006
- Pages: 181
- ISBN: 978-0-06-057863-3
- OCLC: 148665150

White Guilt: How Blacks and Whites Together Destroyed the Promise of the Civil Rights Era is a book by American author Shelby Steele in 2006.

Roger Clegg describes White Guilt as an essay arguing that white Americans acknowledged the injustice of the country's racism in the 1960s to admit the error of their racist ways, an admission that left the United States without an acknowledged source of moral authority, replacing old attitudes with a new and deeply felt sense of guilt. Americans moved to atone for their racist past by enacting President Johnson's Great Society, followed by affirmative action and the celebration of diversity. Steele argues that the results were a disaster for black Americans, not only failing to produce racial equality, but requiring blacks to be grateful to the white bureaucrats who now controlled their lives.

Reviewer Edward Guthman described White Guilt as rehearsing arguments similar to those Steele made in his earlier books, The Content of Our Character: A New Vision of Race in America, and A Dream Deferred: The Second Betrayal of Black Freedom in America. Roger Clegg compares it with the similar 2006 book by John McWhorter, Winning the Race.

== See also ==
- White Guilt
