= The Tyranny of Guilt =

2006 book on politics

- Author: Pascal Bruckner
- Language: French
- Publication date: 2006
- Publication place: France
- English publication date: 2010

The Tyranny of Guilt: An Essay on Western Masochism (French: La tyrannie de la pénitence. Essai sur le masochisme occidental) is a book by Pascal Bruckner about the origin and political impact of the contemporary political culture of Western guilt. It was published in French in 2006 as La Tyrannie de la Pénitence: Essai sur le Masochisme Occidental and in English in 2010, translated by Steven Rendall.

Roger Kimball regards Tyranny of Guilt as a sequel to Bruckner's 1983 book The Tears of the White Man. Richard Wolin preferred to describe it as a "pendant," a revisiting of the theme of Tears of the White Man.

== Themes ==
The book describes what Bruckner claims is disproportional self-criticism of the West. "Nothing is more Western, he writes, than hatred of the West." Crimes which constituted the perennial dynamic of history, in the European context were elevated to a new order of evil. As Bruckner put it, "every Westerner is presumed guilty until proven innocent." He characterized the Euro-American: "Thanks to him, everything becomes clear, evil acquires a face, the dirty rat is universally designated."

Bruckner acknowledges Western sins including racism and slavery, but points out that the West is also responsible for the creation of such things as civil liberties, modern democratic government and abolitionism. "There is no doubt," Bruckner writes, "that Europe has given birth to monsters, but at the same time it has given birth to theories that make it possible to understand and destroy these monsters." Europe engaged in slavery but it also stopped it. The latter nuance is not heard, nor the subject of Arab slave trade.

The West was quick to justify the September 11 attacks: "America had it coming!" The job of ending this self-hatred might have been best performed by a pathologist but, as Bruckner demonstrates, a philosopher is also able to do it. The problem with the tyranny of guilt, according to Bruckner, is not the West is without sin, but that the Western culture of remorse is a disabling form of narcissism that makes it impossible to effectively criticize contemporary non-Western violations of human rights.

Bruckner argues that the West has inadvertently collaborated with Islamists who seek to destroy Western liberal values and political freedom by focusing on western sins including slavery, imperialism, fascism, communism, thereby conceding the right of Islamists to impose their standards on the Western countries to which they immigrate. Julia Pascal summarizes part of Bruckner's argument as an argument that "Europe has never recovered from its own barbarity and that now it seeks to cleanse its original sin with a new Eden; even if this Paradise has 70 waiting virgins." The target of Bruckner's critique, writes Brendan Simms, is "an eagerness to apologize for the sins of colonialism and genocide and other Western crimes" that simplistically defines every Western state as a "penitant... never an innocent victim of terrorist attack but a deserving one: It has, after all, provoked the wrath of the oppressed, either at home or abroad."

Douglas Murray describes Bruckner's characterization of the tyranny of guilt as a form of self-flagellation, a kind of moral intoxicant that "People imbibe because they like it... It lifts them up and exalts them."

According to Bruckner, the Islamo-leftist pushing of the idea of the centrality of Western guilt in contemporary politics idea originated with the Socialist Workers Party (UK) goal of replacing traditional Communism with a worldwide movement to "spearhead a new insurrection in the name of the oppressed." This ideal caught fire beginning in the 1960s, reinvigorating Western leftism with the idea that the United States and Israel are the great oppressors, and uniting the European Left, and the Islamic Republic of Iran in a world view according to which "the Jew has become the Nazi, the Palestinian the Jew and radical Islam is now the victim of Western democracy and not its executioner."

Bruckner sees the beginnings of "sexual apartheid" in Europe in such things as the institution of separate hours for men and women at public swimming pools.
