= Pascal Bruckner =

French writer and philosopher (born 1948)

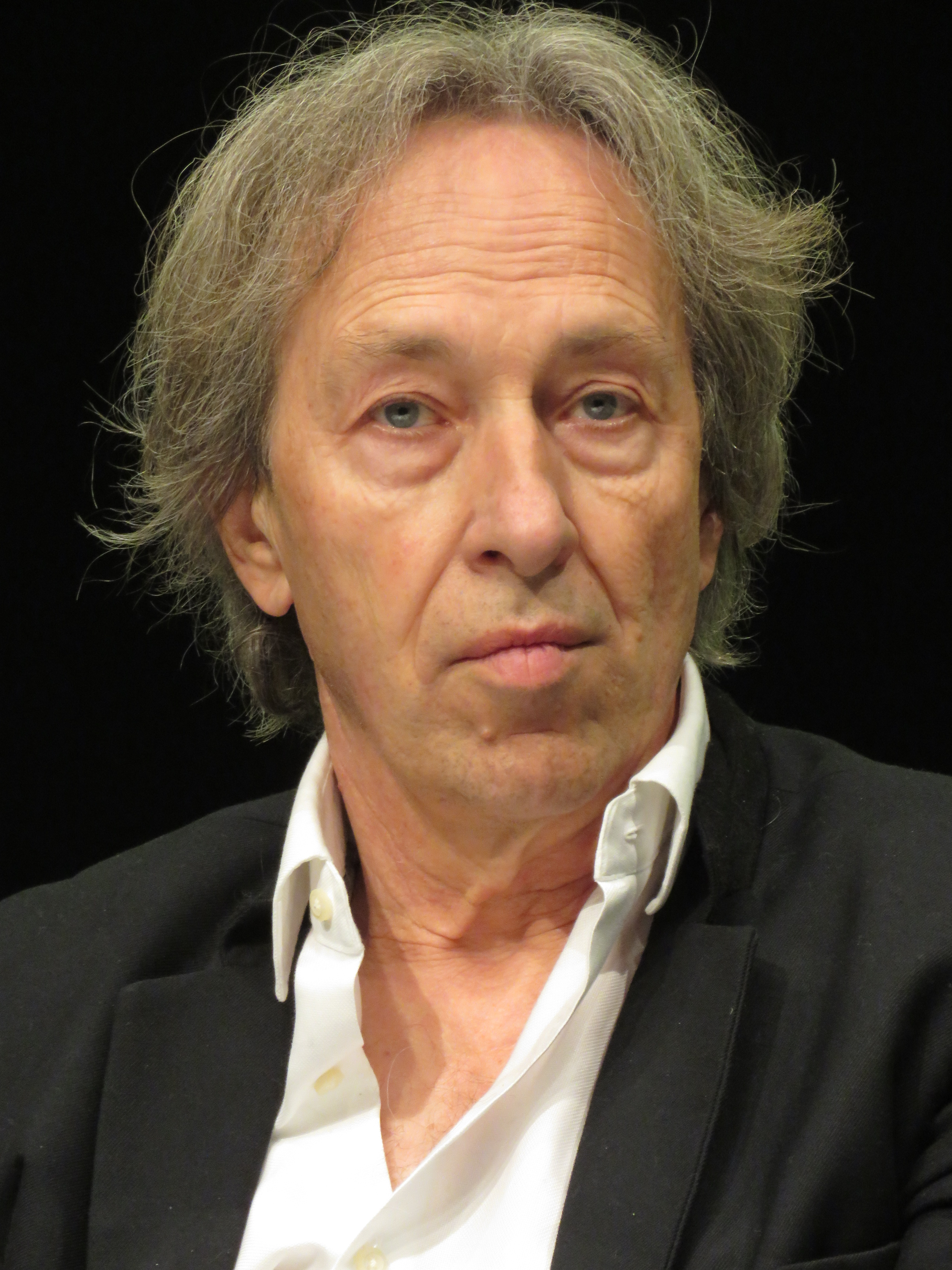
- Bruckner in 2017
- Born: 15 December 1948 (age 77); Paris, France

Education
- Education: Paris I Paris VII Diderot; École Pratique des Hautes Études

Philosophical work
- Era: 20th-/21st-century philosophy
- Region: Western philosophy
- School: Continental philosophy Nouveaux Philosophes
- Institutions: Institut d'Études Politiques de Paris
- Main interests: Political philosophy
- Notable ideas: Criticism of the "White Man's Burden" concept

Pascal Bruckner (French: [bʁyknɛʁ]; born 15 December 1948 in Paris) is a French writer, one of the "New Philosophers" who came to prominence in the 1970s and 1980s. Much of his work has been devoted to critiques of French society and culture.

== Biography ==
Bruckner attended Jesuit schools in his youth.

After studies at the universities of Paris I and Paris VII Diderot, and then at the École Pratique des Hautes Études, Bruckner became maître de conférences at the Institut d'Études Politiques de Paris and a contributor to the Nouvel Observateur.

Bruckner began writing in the vein of the nouveaux philosophes or New Philosophers. He published Parias (Parias), Lunes de fiel (Evil Angels) (adapted as a film by Roman Polanski) and Les voleurs de beauté (The Beauty Stealers) (Prix Renaudot in 1997). Among his essays are La tentation de l'innocence ("The Temptation of Innocence," Prix Médicis in 1995) and, famously, Le Sanglot de l'homme blanc (The Tears of the White Man), an attack on narcissistic and destructive policies intended to benefit the Third World, and more recently La Tyrannie de la pénitence (2006), a book on the West's endless self-criticism, translated as "The Tyranny of Guilt" (2010).

From 1992 to 1999, Bruckner was a supporter of the Croatian, Bosniak and Albanian causes in the Yugoslav Wars, and endorsed the NATO bombing of Yugoslavia in 1999. In 2003, he supported the Iraq War, but later criticized the mistakes of the U.S. military and the use of torture in Abu Ghraib and Guantanamo.

In 2009, he signed a petition in support of Roman Polanski, calling for his release after Polanski was arrested in Switzerland in relation to his 1977 charge for drugging and raping a 13-year-old girl.

== Le Sanglot de l'homme blanc ==
Le Sanglot de l'homme blanc (The White Man's Tears), published by the Éditions le Seuil in May 1983, was a controversial opus. The author describes the anti-Western and pro-Third-World sentimentalism of the Left in the West. The essay had an influence on a whole trend of thought, especially on Maurice Dantec and Michel Houellebecq. The title is a variation on Kipling's "White Man's Burden".

== La Tyrannie de la pénitence ==
Bruckner's 2006 work La Tyrannie de la pénitence: Essai sur le masochisme Occidental (The Tyranny of Guilt: An Essay on Western Masochism) focuses on the origin and political impact of the contemporary political culture of Western guilt.

=== Criticism of multicultural ethnocentrism ===
Bruckner's polemic stance against the ethnocentric nature of some discourses of multiculturalism has kindled an international debate. In an article titled "Enlightenment Fundamentalism or Racism of the Anti-Racists?", he defended Ayaan Hirsi Ali in particular against the criticisms from Ian Buruma and Timothy Garton Ash. According to Bruckner, modern philosophers from Heidegger to Gadamer, Derrida, Max Horkheimer and Theodor Adorno have mounted a broad attack on the Enlightenment, claiming that "all the evils of our epoch were spawned by this philosophical and literary episode: capitalism, colonialism, totalitarianism." Bruckner agrees that the history of the twentieth century attests to the potential of modernity for fanaticism, but argues that the modern thought that issued from the Enlightenment proved capable of criticizing its own errors, and that "Denouncing the excesses of the Enlightenment in the concepts that it forged means being true to its spirit."

== Un bon fils ==
Bruckner's book, Un bon fils, was translated and published in English in 2016, under the title A Dutiful Son. It was first published in France in 2014.

The memoir "charts his journey from pious Catholic child to leading philosopher and writer on French culture. The key figure in Bruckner's life is his father, a virulent anti-Semite, who voluntarily went to work in Germany during the Second World War. He is a violent man who beats his wife. The young Bruckner soon reacts against his father and his revenge is to become his polar opposite, even to the point of being happy to be called a ‘Jewish thinker’, which he is not. ‘My father helped me to think better by thinking against him. I am his defeat.’ Despite this opposition, he remains tied to his father to the very end. He has other ‘fathers’, men such as Sartre, Vladimir Jankélévitch and Roland Barthes who fostered his philosophical development, and describes his friendship with his ‘philosophical twin brother’, Alain Finkielkraut."

== Books ==
- Parias: roman, Seuil, 1985, ISBN 978-2-02-008732-2.
- Lunes de fiel: roman, Seuil, 1981, ISBN 978-2-02-005856-8.
- Evil angels: a novel, Grove Press, 1987, ISBN 978-0-394-54138-9.
- Les Voleurs de beauté: roman, B. Grasset, 1997.
- Le divin enfant: roman, Seuil, 1992, ISBN 978-2-02-013215-2.
- The Divine Child, Rupa & Co., 2005, ISBN 978-81-291-0302-4.
- La tentation de l'innocence, Grasset, 1995, ISBN 978-2-253-13927-0.
- Temptation of innocence. Algora Publishing. 2000. ISBN 978-1-892941-56-5.
- Le Sanglot de l'Homme blanc, Éditions du Seuil, 1983; Simon & Schuster, 1986, ISBN 978-0-02-904160-4.
- The Tears of the White Man: Compassion As Contempt, The Free Press, 1986, ISBN 978-0-02-904160-4.
- La Tyrannie de la pénitence: Essai sur le masochisme Occidental (The Tyranny of Guilt: An Essay on Western Masochism), Grasset, 2006, ISBN 978-2-246-64161-2.
- The Tyranny of Guilt. Translated by Steven Rendall. Princeton University Press. 2010. ISBN 978-0-691-14376-7. "Pascal Bruckner tyranny."
- Perpetual Euphoria: On the Duty to Be Happy. Translated by Steven Rendall. Princeton University Press. 2011. ISBN 978-0-691-14373-6.
- The Fanaticism of the Apocalypse: Save the Earth, Punish Human Beings, translator Steven Rendall = ISBN 9780745669762.
- The Paradox of Love, translator Steven Rendall, Princeton University Press, 2012, ISBN 9780691149141.
- Has Marriage for Love Failed?, translators Steven Rendall and Lisa Neal, Polity Books, 2013, ISBN 9780745669786.
- An Imaginary Racism: Islamophobia and Guilt, translator Steven Rendall, Cambridge, UK, Medford, MA, Polity Books, 2018. ISBN 9781509530663
- They Stole our Beauty, translator Stuart Bell, The 87 Press, 2019. ISBN 9781916477414
- The Truimph of the Slippers, translator Cory Stockwell, Polity Press, 2024. ISBN 9781509559527
- I Suffer Therefore I Am: Portrait of the Victim as Hero, translator Stephen Muecke, Polity Press, 2025. ISBN 978-1-5095-6716-4
